= Contraceptive trials in Puerto Rico =

Human trials of the birth control pill

The first large-scale human trial of the birth control pill was conducted by Gregory Pincus and John Rock in 1955 in Puerto Rico. Before the drug was approved by the FDA in the mainland United States, many poor and uneducated Puerto Rican women were used as research subjects. These trials are a major component in the history of the development of female oral contraceptives, occurring in between initial small trial testing in the Northeast and the release of the drug for public use. The trials are controversial because the Puerto Rican women were uninformed of the potential health and safety risks of the drug. For this reason, there is criticism coming from feminist circles surrounding the trial.

== American testing surrounding the Puerto Rico trials ==
In 1873, the United States federal government passed a series of laws commonly known as the Comstock Laws. The Comstock Laws criminalized the use of the postal service as a means of sending, obtaining, or possessing items considered obscene or salacious (including books, pamphlets, abortifacients, anything used to "facilitate sex", or containing sexual language, etc.). The Comstock Laws thus basically criminalized contraceptive devices and instruments used in abortion procedures. The legislation, however, did not prevent women or businesses from continuing to explore and attempt different methods of birth control. Forced underground, abortion procedures often led to unintentional sterilization or death. Over three-quarters of self-induced abortions resulted in complications.

Infuriated with the lengths that many were forced to go to in order to regulate their own fertility, women began to push for legal rights to contraceptive methods and to govern their own bodies. The movement for public access to birth control started in the early 20th century, propelled by figures like Margaret Sanger. Physicians also lobbied against Comstock Laws, asserting their right to prescribe contraceptives. By the 1930s, U.S. courts were limiting Comstock restrictions on birth control and other purportedly obscene materials.

== Important figures ==
=== Margaret Sanger ===
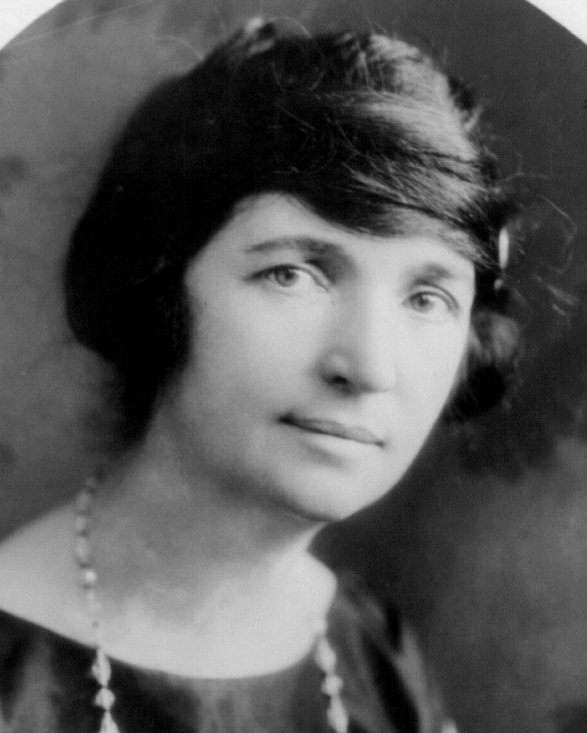
Margaret Sanger, 1922

Margaret Sanger (1879–1966) was a nurse and life-long advocate of women's reproductive rights. Sanger believed that a woman would never truly be free until she had the right to determine whether she wanted to be a mother, and acted on these beliefs by starting a campaign to educate women about sex. She did this while also working as a nurse treating those who had resorted to illegal and unsafe methods of abortion. After fleeing to England for five years to escape persecution for violating the Comstock Laws, Sanger returned to the United States and opened up a clinic (now widely known across the United States as Planned Parenthood) in Brooklyn, New York. The clinic offered women information and resources regarding birth control. The clinic quickly gained popularity and women were soon lining up to be educated. Prior to the birth control movement, there was no uniform sexual education for women, and many found it difficult to find information regarding fertility and contraception. The clinic was only open for ten days before being shut down by authorities for violating the Comstock Act. Sanger was put into jail for 30 days.

Although Sanger's clinic was not a success, the movement for public access to birth control was. By the 1950s there had been a significant amount of research conducted regarding the effects of hormonal drugs. These substances were not explicitly labeled as contraceptive methods, but rather hormonal treatments for infertility, since the laws against contraceptives applied to scientific research as well.

=== John Rock and Gregory Pincus ===
Dr. John Rock and biologist Gregory Pincus, leading experts in fertility and hormone disorders in the United States at the time, collaborated in 1953 to develop an oral contraceptive. Pincus had already established himself as an accomplished scientist after achieving in vitro fertilization in rabbits in 1934, and had established the Worcester Foundation for Experimental Biology in 1944. Around the same time, chemist Carl Djerassi demonstrated the synthesis of progesterone from a wild yam root found in Mexico. The artificial production of progesterone became a key discovery for future fertility research since it was found that high doses of progesterone could halt ovulation.

While Pincus and Rock's research plans had been laid out, they still lacked proper funding. Margaret Sanger and Katharine Dexter McCormick, an heiress who would ultimately fund a large part of the research project, approached Pincus in 1953 about focusing his research on a hormonal contraceptive that would ultimately enable women to control their reproduction.

Once Rock and Pincus had adequate funding, they were able to begin their research. Because Massachusetts law prohibited research on contraceptives, they were forced to conceal the true purpose of their work. The two biologists had proved that their contraceptive hormone treatment had prevented pregnancies in both rats and rabbits, and wanted to take the trial to human test subjects. Consequently, the two made the decision to test their treatment on patients in the Worcester State Psychiatric Hospital. Once the research team was ready to take the trial further in the form of a wider clinical trial, they had to choose a location which would not only offer them a guise from the U.S. government, but also an opportunity to closely monitor and control their test subjects. In the words of Katharine Dexter McCormick, the scientists needed "… a cage of ovulating females to experiment with."

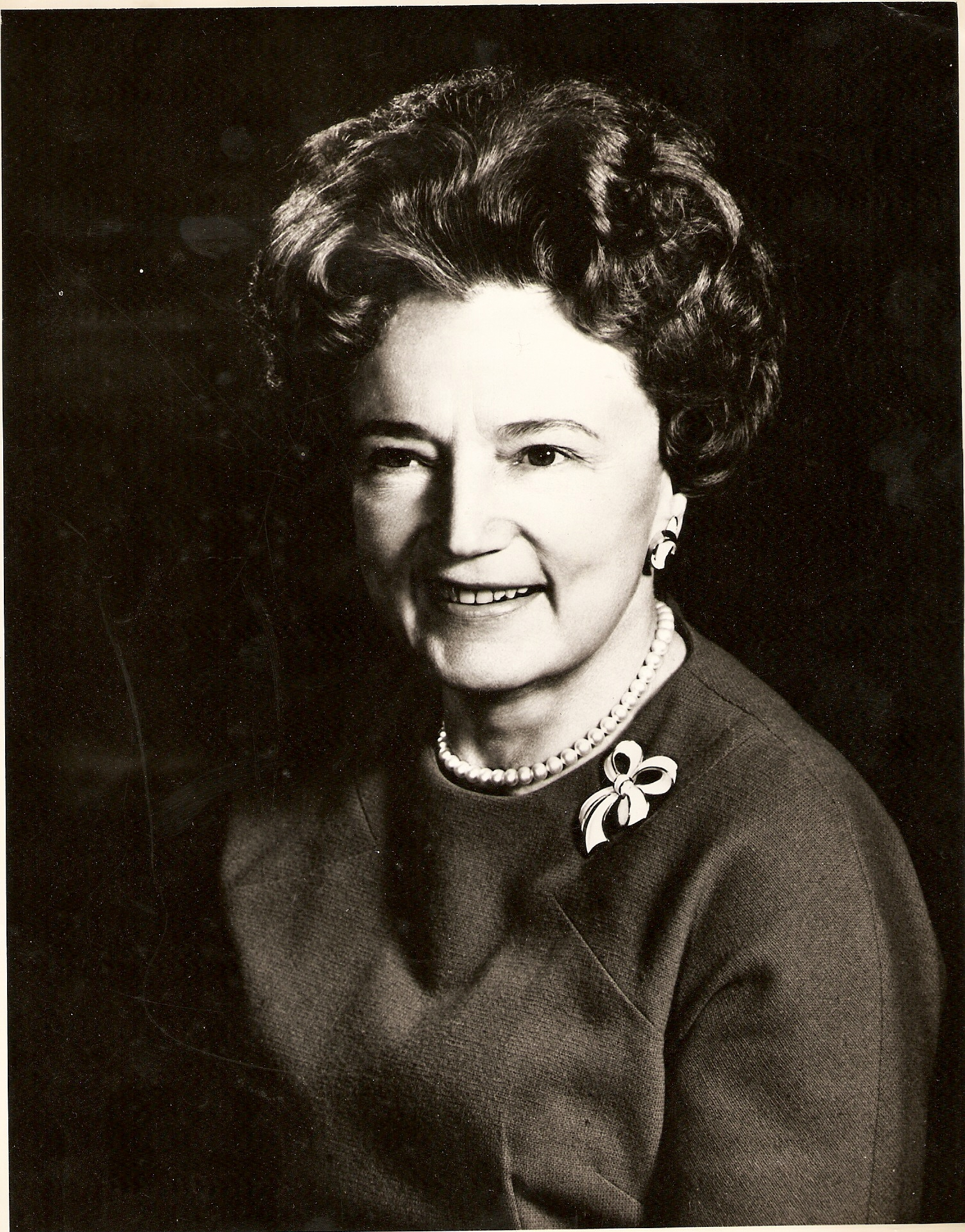
Dr. Edris Rice-Wray, M.D. 1960

=== Katharine Dexter McCormick ===
Katharine Dexter McCormick was an heiress and philanthropist who ended up funding a large part of the research surrounding the first oral contraceptive pill. She met Gregory Pincus through Margaret Sanger and became interested in the research he was conducting. As Pincus was dealing with a lack of funding from the drug company that supported his research, McCormick stepped in to provide funding. She provided most of the funding for the research and the clinical and field trials that occurred to provide the first oral contraceptive.

=== Edris Rice-Wray ===
Medical researcher Edris Rice-Wray was also heavily involved with the research and raised early concerns about heavy dosage causing health problems for women. The pharmaceutical company G. D. Searle & Company produced the pills for the trial.

== The trials ==
=== Location ===
The research team decided that Puerto Rico would be the most suitable place to test the pill. More specifically, the former municipality of Río Piedras, Puerto Rico, where the first trial would take place in 1956. Puerto Rico offered a promising location for the trials for three key reasons. The first reason was that contraceptives had been legal and socially acceptable in Puerto Rico since 1937, so long as they were being used for medical reasons, rather than "social or economic ones." In fact, researchers from the Social Science Research Center published several research articles in the 1950s concluding that the attitudes toward birth control among working-class Puerto Rican families were extremely positive, despite being majority Catholic. The second reason was that Puerto Rico was facing a tremendous population boom, along with high rates of poverty and unemployment. The birth control pill was offered as a solution to overpopulation, and was seen as a way for the United States government to test population control as a global policy. Likewise, mainland social scientists at the time viewed the high rates of poverty and unemployment as being caused by reproduction, consequently putting the brunt of the blame on Puerto Rican women. Such scientists, like J. Mayone Stycos, believed that Puerto Rican women's "sexual patterns ha[d] become fairly routinized and difficult to change," and thus needed to be heavily regulated. Lastly, the third major reason was that Sanger and Pincus' team had an ally with a strong foothold on the island. Puerto Rico already contained multiple birth control clinics which were originally funded by the U.S. government under the New Deal programs. However, many of these clinics were turned over to the heir of Procter & Gamble and eugenicist Clarence Gamble, who had already been involved in plans led by the government to control the population by pushing women towards sterilization as a method of birth control.

=== Participants ===
When Pincus and Rock began their experiment, over 200 women were registered to take part in the program. The women that were recruited for these trials were " …the poorest of the poor, had no place else to go, and, short of sterilization, no birth control options," and were poorly educated. Prior to the trials, sterilization was the most widespread method of birth limitation in Puerto Rico. Moreover, physicians at the time designated contraceptives as "not practical for the majority of people, [but] only for the more intelligent." Thus, the experiment provided lower income women what they believed was a desirable opportunity to control their fertility while also avoiding sterilization. The women who were given the pills only understood that they would prevent pregnancy and did not know about the potential health and safety risks of taking the pills. As one woman who participated in the trials described it, "[p]hysicians dispatched their assistants to rap on doors throughout the town's slums, telling women they didn't have to have another child if they took the pills regularly. That's how many of the test recruits were found, said Conchita Santos, 80, a lifelong resident…Santos, a homemaker, accepted her first package of pills in 1955, shortly after the birth of her first and only child. 'You have to do what's best for you and your family,' she said. 'It's not easy making a choice like that.'"

The women were also not provided any help or care. Margaret Marsh described in her work how many of these women were exploited for their use. During the trial, these women still had the responsibility of caring for and providing for their families. Marsh describes how one woman was 30 years old with ten children, and a husband that "drank heavily and insisted on daily intercourse, but claimed to be too sick to work." Marsh also described a woman who had five children and a husband who was frequently hospitalized for mental illnesses. At times, this treatment left them unable to work or even care for their family and children.

=== Drug administration and side effects ===
The women were administered 10 milligrams of the experimental combination of estrogen and progesterone, more commonly known as Enovid, the first contraceptive pill. The women participating in the trial began to experience side effects, but their complaints were deemed unreliable and outright dismissed by researchers. Some symptoms reported among patients included dizziness, vomiting, nausea, headache, and menstrual irregularities; some of which were so severe that they required hospitalizations. A small group of female medical students were also recruited to participate in the study, but dropped out due to similar symptoms despite being told that they would receive worse grades if they quit. The researchers believed that these side-effects were insignificant in comparison to what they had discovered; a hormonal oral contraceptive that stopped women from becoming pregnant.

=== Results ===
Despite half of the trial participants dropping out of the experiment and a significant number of pregnancies occurring within the test groups, researchers believed the trials were overall a success. They claimed that the majority of pregnancies occurred when participants either missed pills or withdrew from the study. Thus, they concluded that the pill successfully inhibited ovulation using two steroids: 19-nor-17-ethinyl testosterone and 17-ethinyl estraeneolone. John Rock further proclaimed that the drug could "provide a natural means of fertility control such as nature uses after ovulation and during pregnancy." Enovid was then approved by the FDA in 1960 as an oral contraceptive.

After the trials in Puerto Rico, the drug was approved in the U.S. in 1957 for consumer use as a medication to treat severe menstrual side effects. The drug was approved as a female oral contraceptive, the first in the U.S., in May 1960. G.D. Searle and company profited greatly from widespread sales of the product, although the company was initially extremely hesitant to be associated with the trials in any way.

=== Deaths ===
Three deaths occurred among patients who were taking the birth control drug during the trials. Despite strong circumstantial evidence that the pill was causing these unexpected deaths, they were not reported for two reasons. Firstly, those conducting the trial considered the deaths to be coincidental. Secondly, autopsies were never conducted on the bodies of the three women.

== Enovid ==
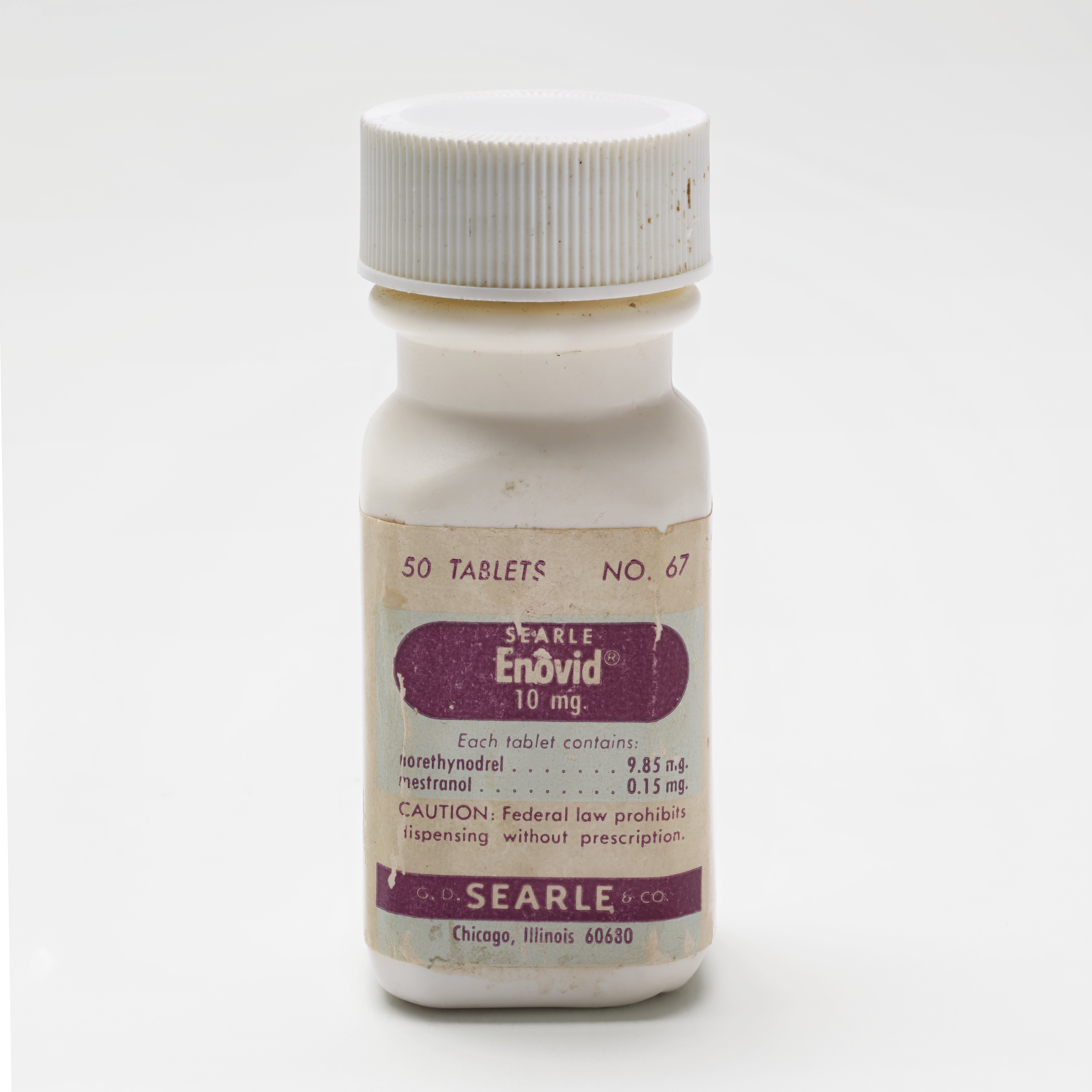
Bottle of Enovid 10mg contraceptive

The drug used in this trial was known as Enovid. The drug was a combination of estrogen and progesterone, the same hormones used in modern combined oral contraceptive pills. Enovid was submitted for regulatory approval in 1957.

=== Dosage ===
The drug Enovid used in this trial was a much higher dosage than oral contraceptive pills prescribed today. Modern health practices facilitate prescriptions for birth control, averaging about 0.75 milligrams per dose. The original dosing of 10 milligrams is more than 100 times the acceptable concentration of hormones in contraceptive pills today. The original dosage from the trials was eventually dropped to 5 milligrams after severe side effects were observed, including nausea, dizziness, headaches, and blood clots, along with the death of three women in Puerto Rico.

=== Timeline of Enovid ===
Enovid was submitted first for regulatory approval in 1957 for the treatment of menstrual disorders and infertility. Originally, it was not submitted to the FDA as an oral contraceptive, although it was developed as such. A supplemental application was submitted to the FDA in 1959 to expand its usage as a contraceptive. It was approved in 1960 and in 1961 and it was found that it could cause rare, but serious complications.

Timeline of the approval of Enovid as a contraceptive pill
Important dates	
1955	The first large-scale human trial of the contraceptive pill occurs in Puerto Rico.
1957	Enovid approved by the FDA for the treatment of menstrual disorders.
1959	Enovid resubmitted to the FDA for approval as a contraceptive.
1960	Enovid approved as the first oral contraceptive pill.

== Ethics and controversy ==
Even though the composition of the original birth control pill was modified after trials due to the dangerous levels of hormones, the discovery and the authorization of the pill made a profound impact on women's reproductive rights in the United States. Women were now able to directly control their own fertility because of the legalization of the pill and the studies that aided in the authorization of the pill. Instead of having to deal with an accidental pregnancy, women were provided with the opportunity to delay having children, allowing them to pursue higher educational goals or seek employment. Based on statistics, the pill was considered "…one of the most transformational developments in the business sector in the last 85 years. Fully one-third of the wage gains women have made since the 1960s are the result of access to oral contraceptives." Additionally, studies have shown evidence that "between 1969 and 1980, the dropout rate among women with access to the pill was 35 percent lower than women without access to the pill," and that "birth control has been estimated to account for more than 30 percent of the increase in the proportion of women in skilled careers from 1970 to 1990."

The ethics of the trial in Puerto Rico are still debated. A Puerto Rican woman named Delia Mestre, who participated in the trial unknowingly, was questioned about her participation in the experiments. She explained that "the experiments were both good and bad. Why didn't anyone let us make some decisions for ourselves?" She also stated, "I have difficulty explaining that time to my own grown children. I have very mixed feelings about the entire thing." Mestre and the other women who participated in the trials were not allowed to make an informed decision on whether they wanted to serve in the trials.

== Feminist response to trials ==
In a 2006 review of Ana María García's 1982 film La Operación, Tamara Falicov noted that "Puerto Rico became an important testing ground for U.S. pharmaceutical companies working on the effectiveness of the birth control pill."
