= Celso-Ramón García =

American physician

Celso-Ramón García (1922 – February 1, 2004) was an American physician who specialized in reproductive endocrinology and infertility. He oversaw early clinical trials of the first oral contraceptive pill in Puerto Rican women and later became a professor of human reproduction at the University of Pennsylvania.

== Early life ==
Celso-Ramón García was born in 1922 to Spanish immigrants in New York City. He completed an undergraduate degree in chemistry at Queens College and then a medical degree at SUNY Downstate Medical Center, graduating in 1945. After an internship at Norwegian Hospital in Brooklyn, he served in the U.S. Army Medical Corps for two years, working at Valley Forge General Hospital in Phoenixville, Pennsylvania, and at Ladd Air Force Base in Fairbanks, Alaska. In 1948 he returned to Brooklyn, where he completed his residency in obstetrics and gynecology at Cumberland Hospital.

== Career ==
In 1953, due to a lack of academic positions in the U.S., García moved to Puerto Rico to take up a position as assistant professor of obstetrics and gynecology at the University of Puerto Rico's newly established medical school. Soon afterwards he was introduced to Gregory Pincus, who with John Rock was preparing to commence clinical trials of the first oral contraceptive pill. Pincus recruited García to oversee the trials of the pill in Puerto Rico, while Rock arranged for García to commence a fellowship in infertility at the Free Hospital for Women in Brookline, Massachusetts. He soon moved to Boston to work at Harvard Medical School with Rock, commuting frequently to Puerto Rico to manage the contraceptive pill trials. Rock and García moved their practice briefly to Faulkner Hospital before returning to the Free Hospital for Women. García was hired by Pincus as a senior scientist at the Worcester Foundation for Biomedical Research in 1960 and became chief of the infertility clinic at Massachusetts General Hospital in 1962. Although the Puerto Rican oral contraceptive trials had finished by this time, García continued to visit Puerto Rico regularly to perform post-trial surveillance on women who had participated in the trial and through this process published important research on long-term side effects of the pill and how well it was accepted by patients.

García left Boston for Pennsylvania in 1965, when he was appointed chair of the obstetrics and gynecology department at the University of Pennsylvania. In Pennsylvania, he pioneered what he called "conservational surgery" for fallopian tube defects, which in the pre-IVF era was the only fertility-preserving treatment for women with tubal disease. After a sabbatical in Germany with Kurt Semm, García established one of the first programs for minimally invasive laparoscopic surgery in the United States. He also used a novel approach to prevent intra-abdominal adhesions: intraperitoneal corticosteroids and antihistamines. He served on the faculty of the University of Pennsylvania for 39 years, ultimately in the position of William Shippen, Jr. Professor of Human Reproduction.

== Affiliations ==
García served as president of the American Society for Reproductive Medicine, the American Association of Planned Parenthood Physicians, the National Medical Committees of Planned Parenthood of America, and the Society of Reproductive Surgeons. He was a fellow of the American College of Surgeons.

== Death ==
García died from cardiovascular disease on February 1, 2004, in Boston, four weeks after his wife, Shirley Stoddard, had died. The Celso-Ramón García Professorship of Obstetrics & Gynecology was established at the Perelman School of Medicine at the University of Pennsylvania in 1994.

== See also ==
- List of Queens College people
