= Ryuzo Yanagimachi =

Japanese-born American scientist (1928–2023)

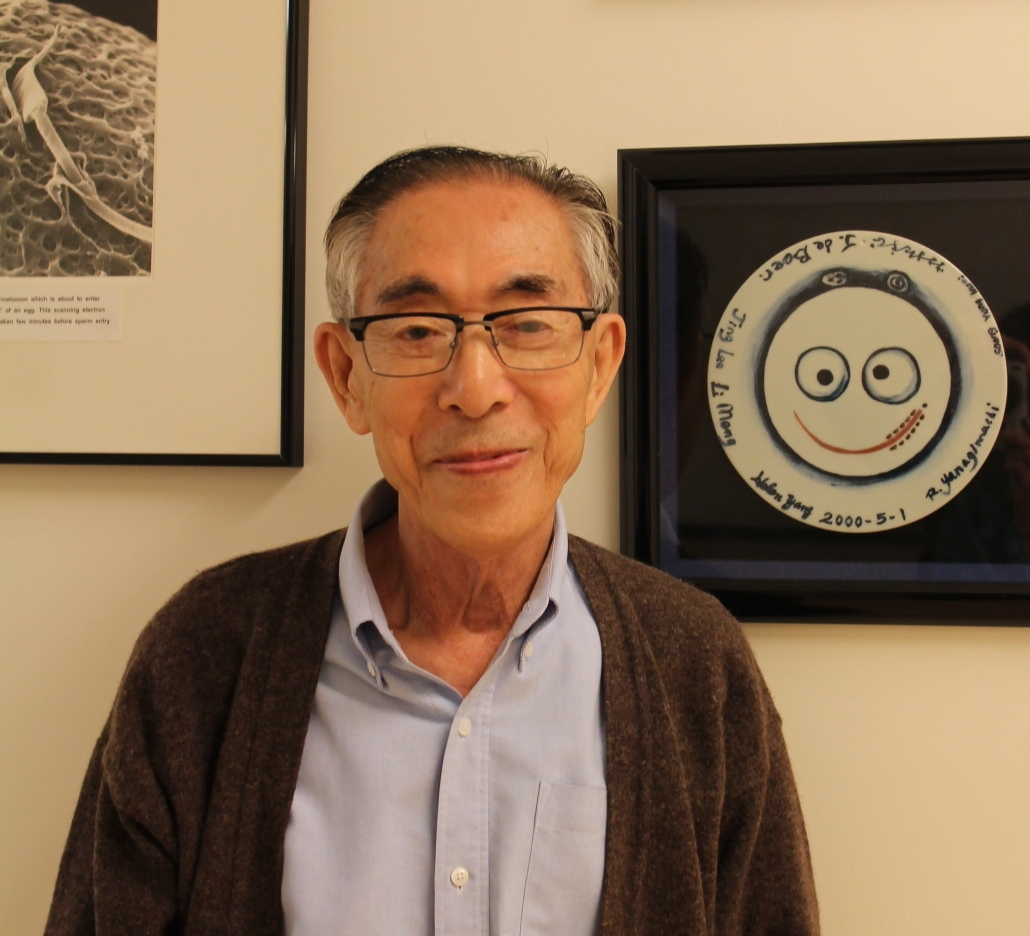
- Yanagimachi in 2014
- Born: August 27, 1928; Ebetsu, Hokkaido, Japan
- Died: September 27, 2023 (aged 95); Honolulu, Hawaii, U.S.
- Education: Hokkaido University
- Scientific career
- Workplaces: Worcester Foundation for Biomedical Research; John A. Burns School of Medicine; University of Hawaiʻi at Mānoa

Ryuzo Yanagimachi (柳町 隆造, Yanagimachi Ryūzō; August 27, 1928 – September 27, 2023) was a Japanese-born, American-based scientist. He made numerous key contributions to the study of mammalian fertilization, and he was also a pioneer in the cloning field. Accordingly, he assisted in fertilization technologies such as in vitro fertilization and direct sperm injection into the egg (commonly called intracytoplasmic sperm injection or ICSI), which are widely used today in human infertility clinics throughout the world. In 1997, his laboratory at the University of Hawaiʻi at Mānoa successfully cloned mice using the Honolulu technique.

== Biography ==
Yanagimachi was born in Ebetsu and raised in Sapporo, Japan. He received a BS in zoology in 1952 and a DSc in animal embryology in 1960, both from Hokkaido University. Being unable to find a research position initially, he then worked as a high school teacher for two years.

Yanagimachi applied for a post-doctoral position with Dr. M. C. Chang of the Worcester Foundation for Biomedical Research in Shrewsbury, Massachusetts. He got this position and there discovered how to fertilize hamster eggs in vitro. This work led to in vitro fertilization of eggs of humans and other mammalian species.

In 1964, he returned to Hokkaido University as a temporary lecturer, with the possibility of later being appointed to an assistant professorship. However, another person eventually got the position.

In 1966 Yanagimachi ended up at the University of Hawaiʻi as an assistant professor and became a full professor of the Department of Anatomy and reproductive biology at the John A. Burns School of Medicine. After working for 38 years at the University of Hawaii, he retired at the end of 2005 to become a professor emeritus but kept working with junior fellows. He was married to Hiroko, a former child psychologist. She could not find work in her field when they came to the U.S. due to a language barrier, so she went to work with researchers in his lab as an electron microscopist.

Ryuzo Yanagimachi died in Honolulu from complications of a fall on September 27, 2023, at the age of 95.

== Cloning ==
In July 1998, Yanagimachi's team published work in Nature on cloning mice from adult cells. Yanagimachi named the new cloning technique they had created to do this to work the "Honolulu technique". The first mouse born was named Cumulina, after the cumulus cells whose nuclei were used to clone her. At the time of the publication of this work, over fifty mice spanning three generations had been produced through this technique. This was accomplished by an international team of scientists, including co-authors Teruhiko Wakayama, Tony Perry, Maurizio Zuccotti and K.R. Johnson.

The Yanagimachi laboratory moved from the warehouse which had housed it for over thirty years into the newly created Institute for Biogenesis Research in the Biomedical Sciences Tower of the John A. Burns School of Medicine. Money and renown from the opportunities opened up by the Nature article made the institute possible.

The Yanagimachi laboratory and his former associates continued to make advances in cloning. The first male animal cloned from adult cells was announced in 1999. In 2004 the laboratory participated in the cloning of an infertile male mouse. This advance may be used to produce many infertile animals for use in research on human infertility.

Mice cloned by the Honolulu technique were displayed at the Bishop Museum in Honolulu, Hawaiʻi, and the Museum of Science and Industry in Chicago, Illinois.

== Major work before and after 1960 ==
As a graduate student of Hokkaido University in Japan, Yanagimachi studied fish (herring) fertilization and the sexual organization of rhizocephalans (parasitic barnacles). In fish, he discovered calcium-dependent, chemotactic movement of spermatozoa into the micropyle through which the fertilizing spermatozoon enters the egg. This was the first discovery of sperm chemotaxis in vertebrate animals. In rhizocephala, he found that adults are not hermaphroditic as generally thought, but bisexual. The so-called "testis" in an adult animal is a receptacle of cells from larval males. This discovery revolutionized biological studies of rhizocephalans and related animals.

While he was at the Worcester Foundation for Biomedical Research as Dr. M.C. Chang's postdoctoral fellow (1960-1964), he witnessed and recorded the entire process of sperm penetration through the zona pellucida and fusion with the egg proper in a living (hamster) egg, which was the first in mammals. He was one of few who began to study the process and mechanisms of mammalian fertilization using in vitro fertilization technique.

Throughout his career he has made significant contributions to the understanding of mammalian fertilization and to the development of assisted fertilization technologies such as in vitro fertilization (IVF) and intracytoplasmic sperm injection (ICSI), which are now widely used in human infertility clinics worldwide. His 1994 review, "Mammalian Fertilization", published in Physiology of Reproduction, (Knobil & Neill, eds., Ravan Press), is widely cited in the field.

Yanagimachi himself considered "cloned mice" to be byproducts of fertilization study and that the production of cloned animals in various species triggered/accelerated the research on the genomic reprogramming of adult somatic (body) cell nuclei as well as the production of pluripotent stem cells from adult cells for therapeutic purposes. He retired in 2005, but continued working on natural and assisted reproduction.

In 2014, he had an interview with The Prism in which he was quoted saying:

Unlike people, nature never lies.

== Awards and honors ==
- Fulbright Scholarship, US-Japan, 1960 and 1964
- Lalor Foundation Scholarship, US, 1964–1966.
- Zoological Society Prize, Japan, 1977
- Research Award, Society for Study of Reproduction, US, 1982
- University of Hawaii Regents' Medal for Excellence in Research, US, 1988
- Recognition Award, Serono Symposia, US, 1989
- Marshall Medal, Society for the Study of Fertility, UK,1994
- International Prize for Biology, Japan, 1996
- Honorable Degree of Philosophy from the University of Rome, Italy, 1997
- Distinguished Andrologist Award, American Society of Andrology, US, 1998
- Induction to the Polish Academy of Sciences, Poland, 1998
- Carl G. Hartman Award, Society for the Study of Reproduction, US, 1999
- Honorable Degree of Philosophy, University of Pavia, Italy, 1999
- Honorary Member, European Society of Human Reproduction and Embryology, 1999
- Pioneer Award, International Embryo Transfer Society, 2000
- Induction to the National Academy of Sciences, US, 2001
- Honorable Degree of Philosophy, Hokkaido University, Japan, 2002
- Induction to Hall of Honor, National Institute of Child Health and Human Development, US, 2003
- Donald Henry Barron Lecture, University of Florida, US, 2003
- Pioneer Award in Reproduction Research, US, 2012
- Lifetime Achievement Award, Society of Reproductive Biologists and Technologists, US, 2014
- Kyoto Prize in Advanced Technology, Japan, 2023
