= Hoagland-Pincus Conference Center =

Coordinates: 42°17′12.4″N 71°43′41.2″W

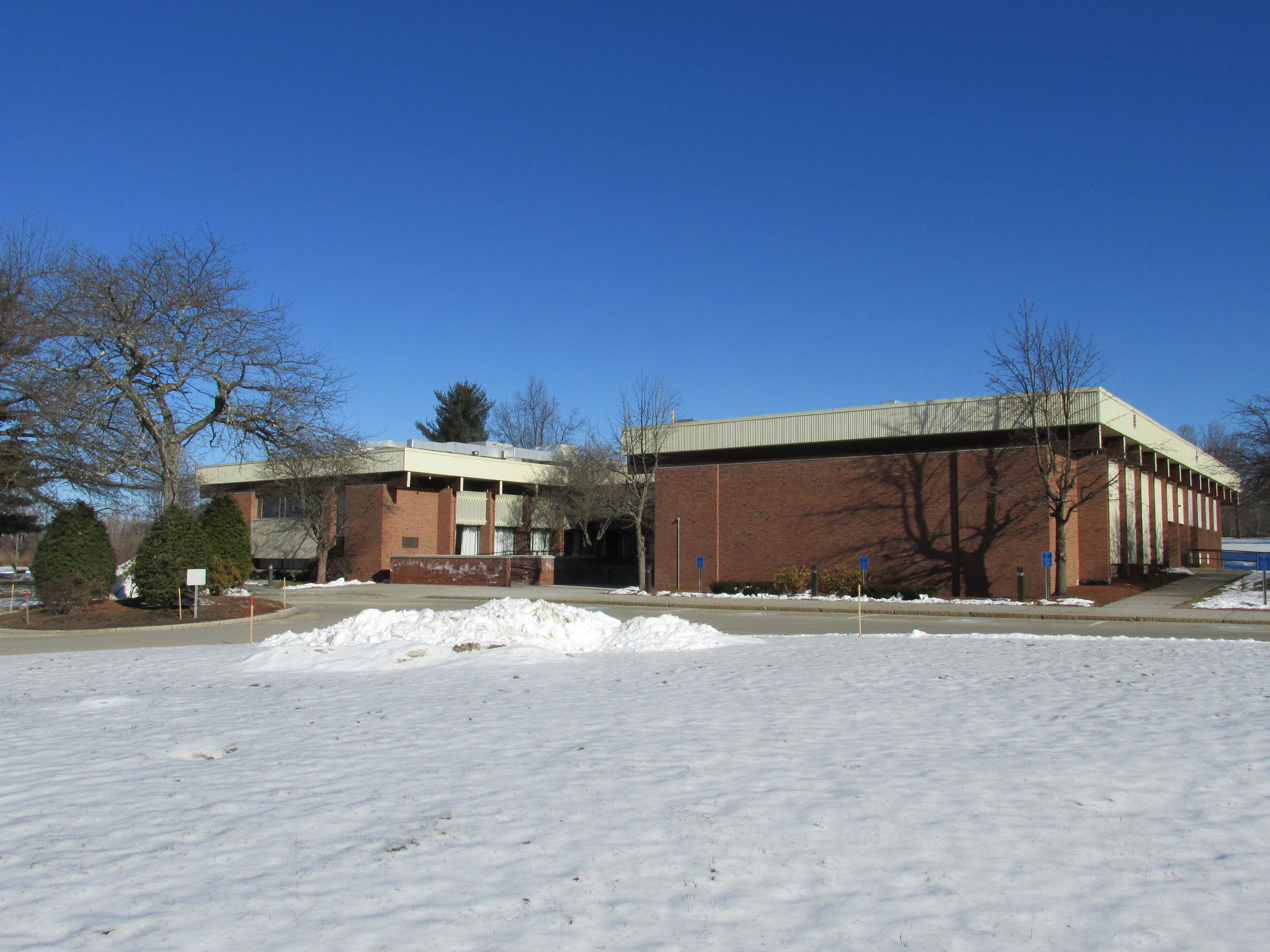
Hoagland-Pincus Conference Center

The Hoagland-Pincus Conference Center is a conference facility of the University of Massachusetts Medical School.

It is named for Hudson Hoagland and Gregory Goodwin Pincus, the co-founders of the Worcester Foundation for Experimental Biology.

It is located in Shrewsbury, Massachusetts at the site of the former Worcester Foundation for Experimental Biology, where the first birth control pill was developed.
