= Margaret Sanger Awards =

Planned Parenthood Federation of America award

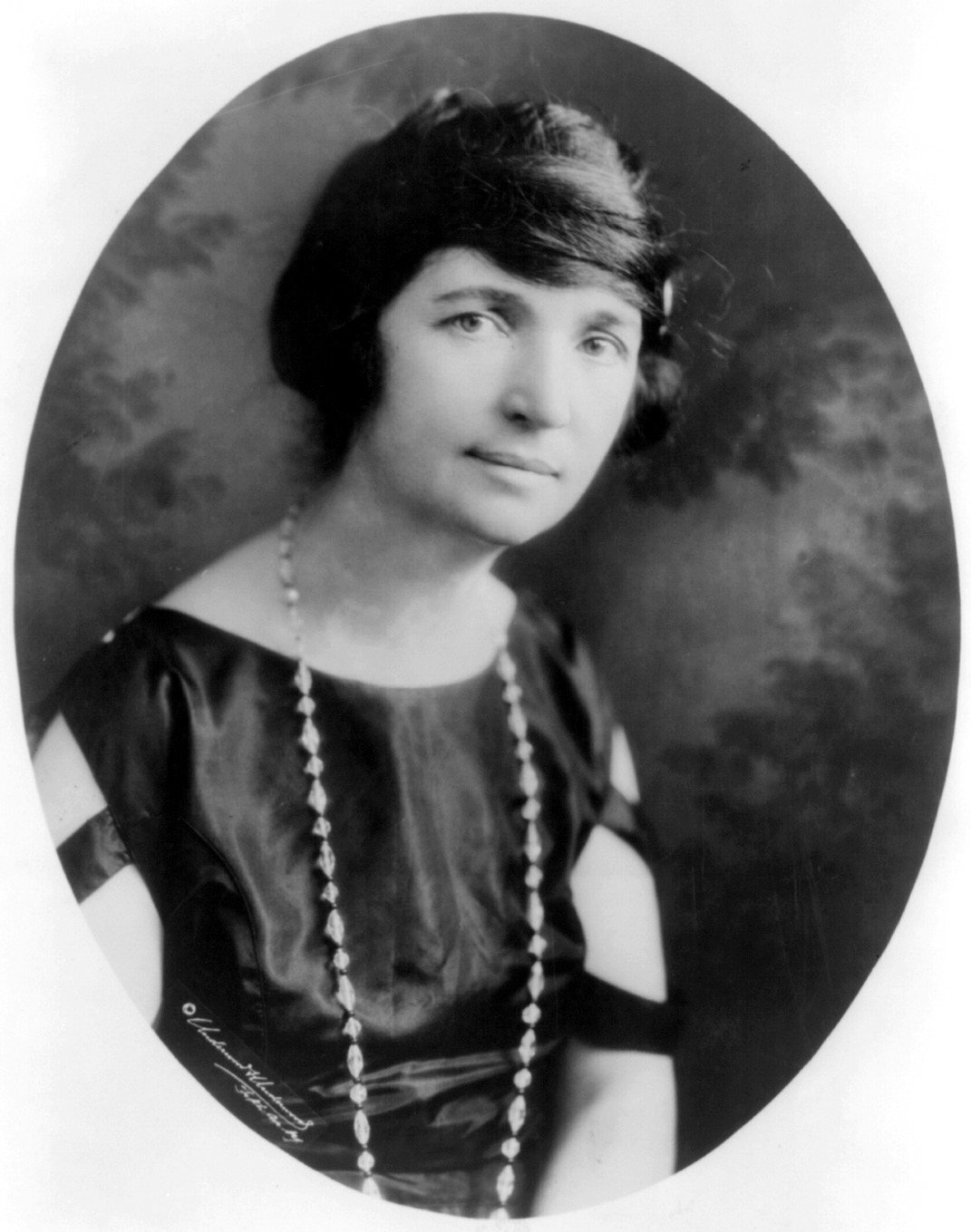
Margaret Sanger

The Margaret Sanger Award was an honor awarded annually by the Planned Parenthood Federation of America from 1966 to 2015. Created to honor the legacy of Margaret Sanger, the founder of Planned Parenthood, it is the Federation's highest honor. It is given to individuals to recognize excellence and leadership in the reproductive health and rights movement. Although it is identified as an annual award, it hasn't been given out and since 2015.

== National award recipients ==
=== 1960s ===
==== 1966 ====
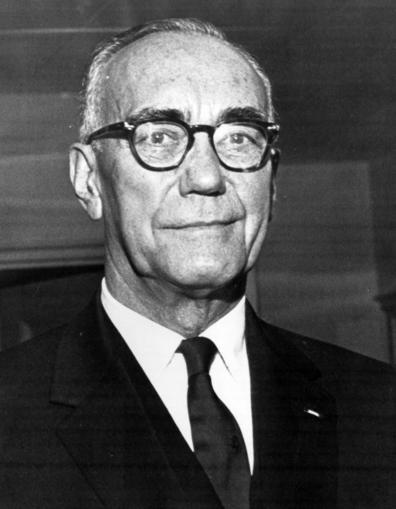
William Draper

The first Sanger awards were given in 1966 under four categories, Human Rights, Medicine, Leadership and Service, on the 50th anniversary of Planned Parenthood's founding. The award in human rights was presented to Martin Luther King Jr. who was unable to attend due to critical work on his Chicago Freedom Movement; his wife, Coretta Scott King, received the award on his behalf. Carl G. Hartman was awarded with the award in medicine for his research that led to the discovery of basic principles of birth control methods. He was also unable to be present to receive it due to illness. Betty Mary Goetting was the third person to receive the National Margaret Sanger Award for her work in promoting birth control in El Paso, Texas. Lyndon Baines Johnson, then president, received the award in World Leadership for his "vigorous and far-sighted leadership" in implementing a national family planning policy. He sent his labor secretary, Willard Wirtz, to receive it on his behalf. The final award was presented to William Draper for service in voluntary family planning, he was the only recipient who was present to receive the award.

==== 1967 ====
Philanthropist John D. Rockefeller III won the Sanger Award in World Leadership. His recognition underscored his being instrumental in organizing the first World Population Conference as well as his founding of the Population Council.

==== 1968 ====
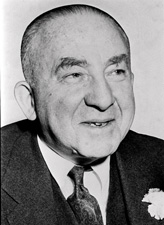
Ernest Gruening

Ernest Gruening received the Margaret Sanger Award in World Leadership. At the time he was a Democratic U.S. Senator from Alaska.

==== 1969 ====
Hugh Mackintosh Foot, also known as Lord Caradon, was given the Margaret Sanger Award in World Leadership for his "farsighted leadership in the area of international family planning and population issues". At the time, he was the British ambassador to the United Nations. Lord Caradon was a well known supporter of Planned Parenthood, free contraceptives and sex education in schools.

=== 1970s ===
==== 1970 ====
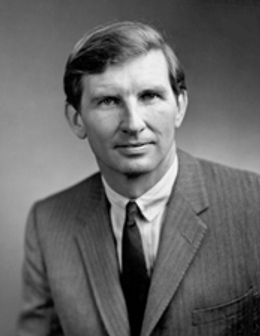
Joseph D. Tydings

Then a Democratic U.S. Senator from Maryland, Joseph D. Tydings received the Margaret Sanger award in 1970 for "activities related to population and birth control." Tydings was known as a strong proponent for access to reproductive health care having had introducing fifteen bills towards this goal. He also promoted gearing foreign aid to promote reproductive care access.

==== 1971 ====
The 1971 Margaret Sanger Award was presented to Louis M. Hellman for service in the field of voluntary family planning. A physician, at the time of his receiving the award he was the Deputy Assistant Secretary for Population Affairs in the Department of Health, Education and Welfare. He was known for his actions in 1958 when he defied a ban on prescribing contraception in the New York municipal hospital system as part of a citywide campaign supported by Planned Parenthood that was successful in getting the ban repealed. As deputy secretary, he continued his advocacy of access to contraceptives as well as abortion access.

==== 1972 ====
In 1972, Planned Parenthood awarded its former president, Alan Frank Guttmacher, with the award.

==== 1973 ====
Sarah Lewit Tietze and Christopher Tietze, MD

==== 1974 ====
Harriet F. Pilpel, JD

==== 1975 ====
In 1975, Cass Canfield a publishing executive and rose to become Chair of the Board of Harper and Row (now HarperCollins). He was also a former chair of the International Planned Parenthood Federation and the Planned Parenthood Federation of America. He was also noted to have taken a "special interest" in advocating for a Margaret Sanger commemorative stamp from the U.S. Postal Service, realized in 1972 as the Family Planning commemorative stamp.

==== 1976 ====
John Rock, MD

==== 1977 ====
Bernard Berelson, PhD

==== 1978 ====
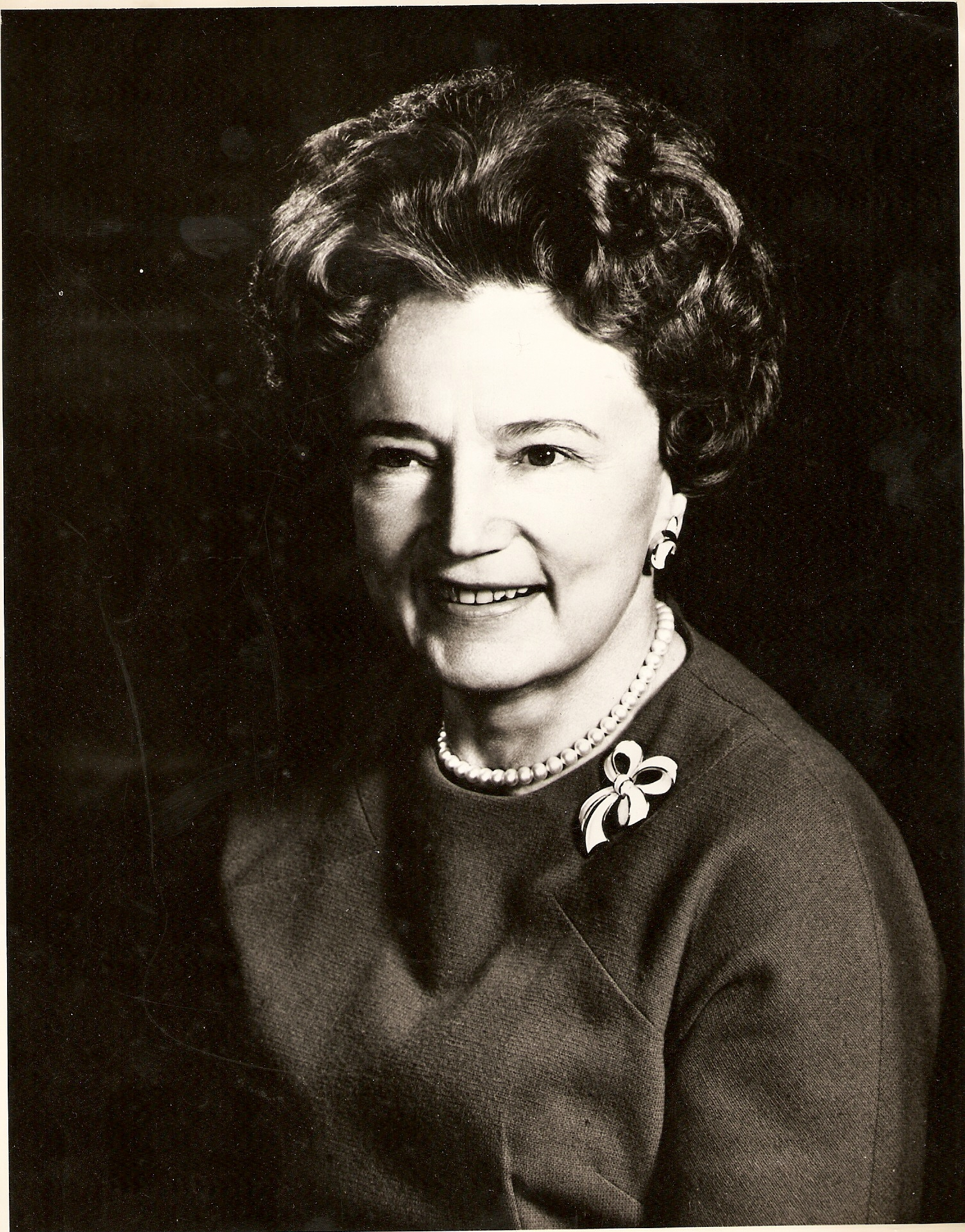
Edris Rice-Wray

Julia Henderson Frederick S. Jaffe Edris Rice-Wray, MD, PhD

==== 1979 ====
Alfred F. Moran Robert Packwood

=== 1980s ===
==== 1980 ====
Mary S. Calderone, MD Sarah Weddington, Esq.

==== 1981 ====
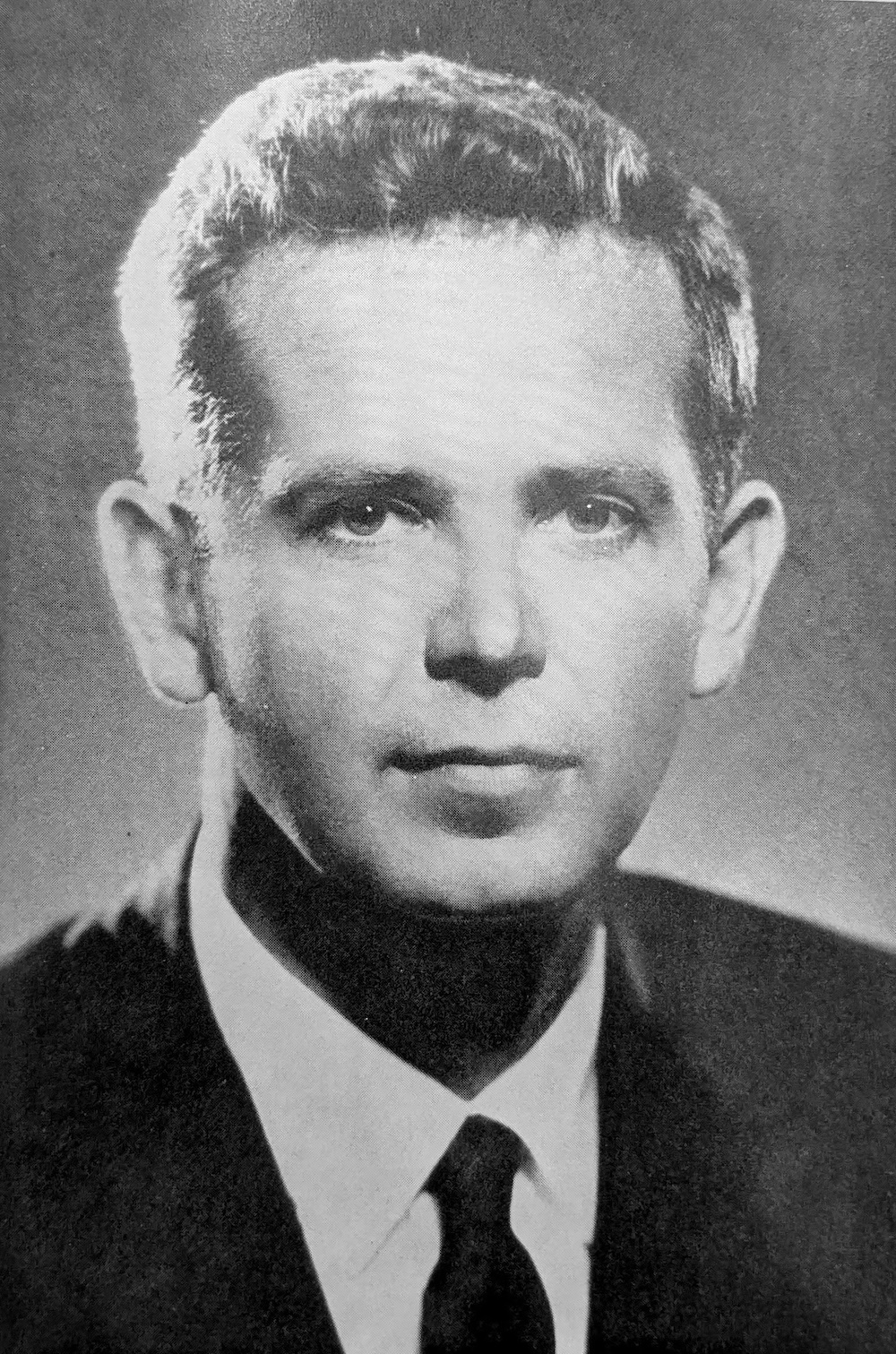
William G. Milliken

William G. Milliken

==== 1982 ====
Madame Jihan Sadat

==== 1983 ====
Katharine Hepburn, actress

==== 1984 ====
Bishop Paul Moore

==== 1985 ====
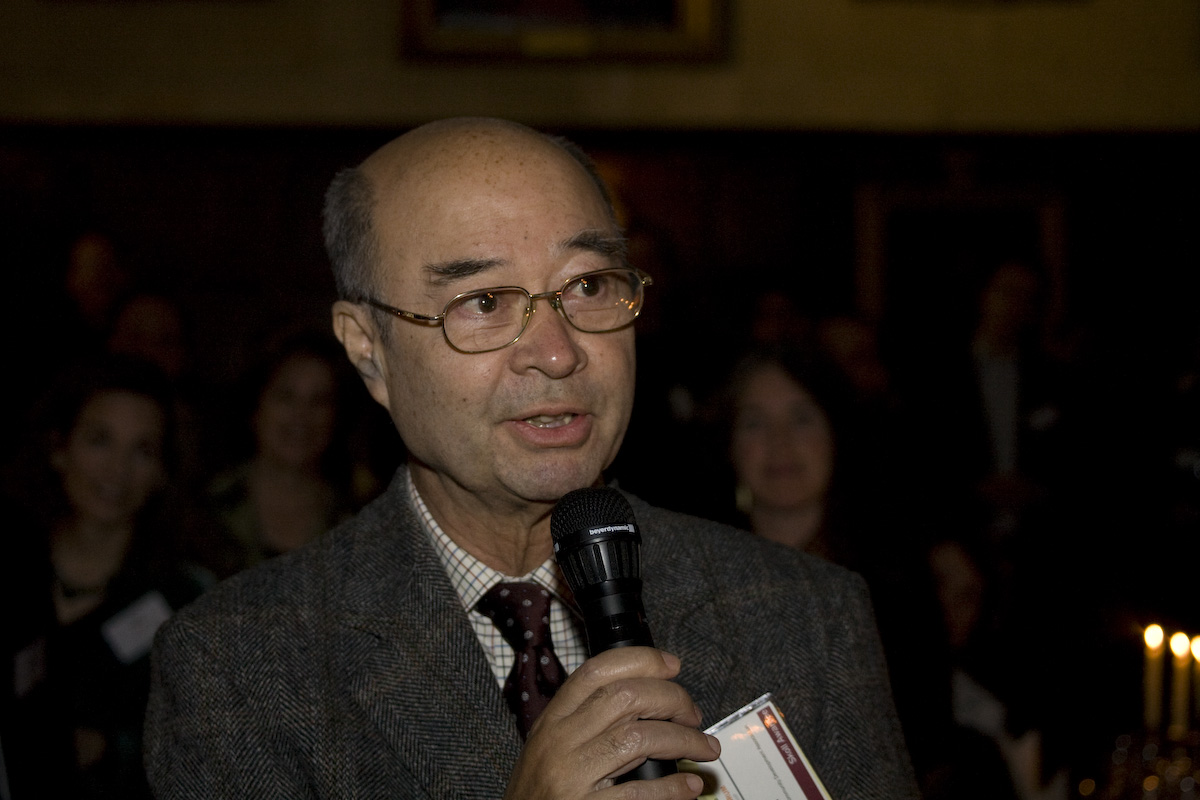
Mechai Viravaidya

Guadalupe de la Vega Mechai Viravaidya

==== 1986 ====
Jeannie I. Rosoff

==== 1987 ====
Phil Donahue, media personality, writer, film producer, and the creator and host of The Phil Donahue Show

==== 1988 ====
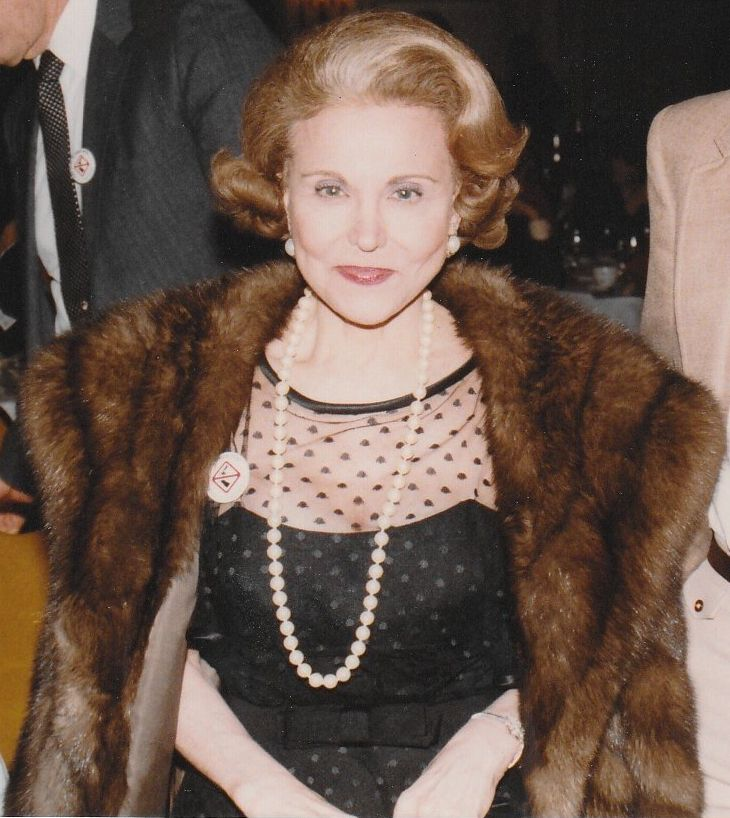
Ann Landers

Ann Landers Abigail Van Buren

==== 1989 ====
Canadian pro-choice advocate Henry Morgentaler received the 1989 Margaret Sanger Award. He was known for his successful efforts spearheading efforts to repeal Canadian laws restricting access to abortions. Planned Parenthood also noted his "outstanding contributions to expanding the public's understanding of reproductive health and individual rights issues" in presenting him with the award.

=== 1990s ===
==== 1990 ====
Mufaweza Khan

==== 1991 ====
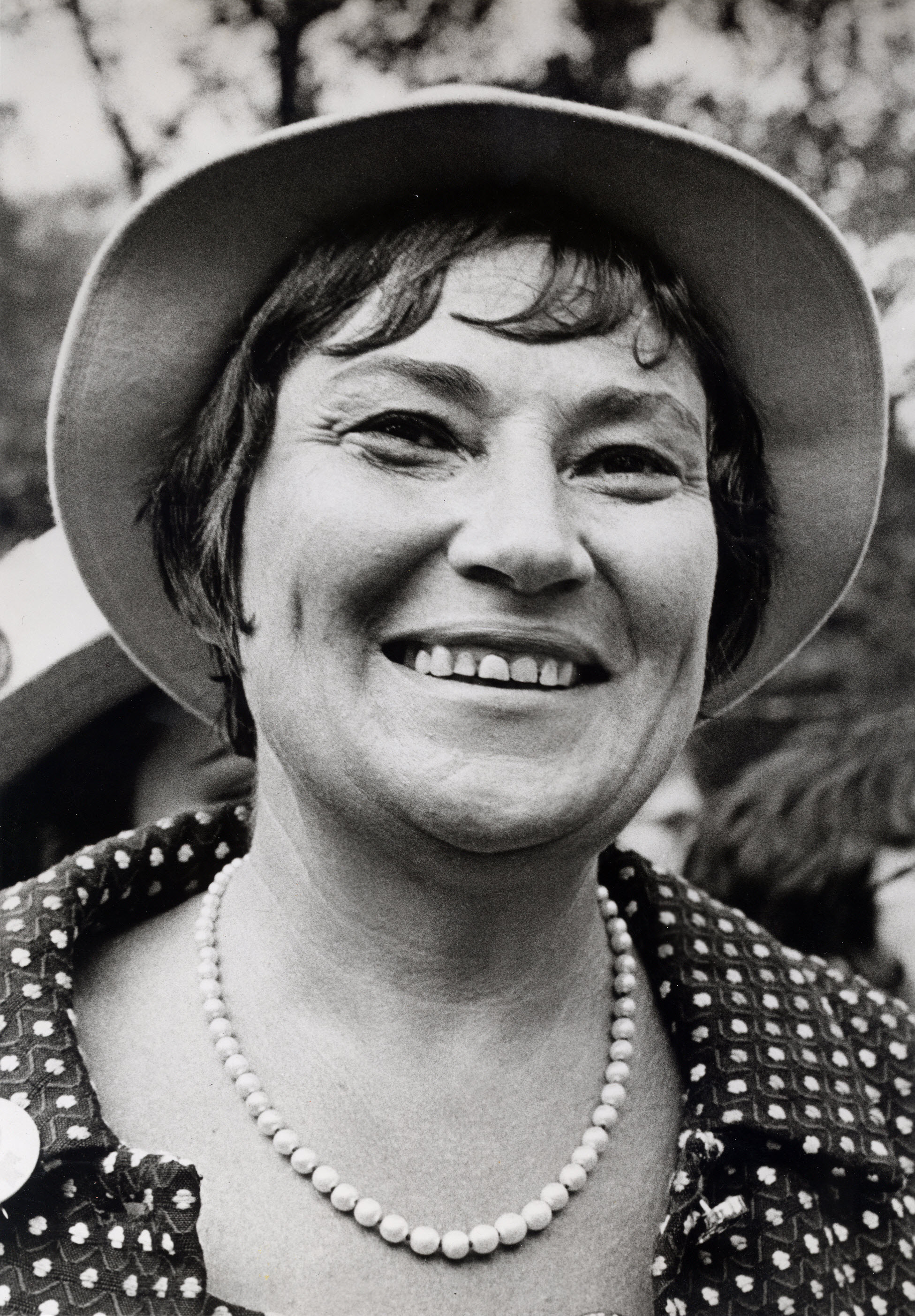
Bella Abzug

Bella Abzug, lawyer, U.S. Representative, social activist, and leader in the women's movement

==== 1992 ====
Faye Wattleton, president of Planned Parenthood

==== 1993 ====
Richard Steele, Audrey Steele Burnand, Barbara Steele Williams

==== 1994 ====
Fred Sai

==== 1995 ====
Jane Elizabeth Hodgson, MD, obstetrician and gynecologist

==== 1996 ====
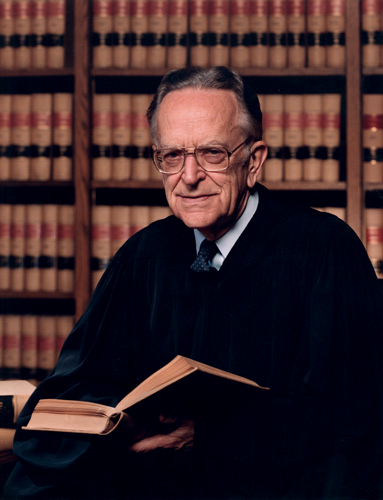
Harry A. Blackmun

Supreme Court Justice Harry A. Blackmun

==== 1997 ====
Louise Tyrer, MD Robin Chandler Duke

==== 1998 ====
The Reverend Howard Moody

=== 2000s ===
==== 2000 ====
The 2000 Margaret Sanger Award went to Nafis Sadik, a physician and executive director of the United Nations Population Fund. She was presented with the honor at Planned Parenthood's annual Honors Gala concluding its Annual Conference in Washington, D.C. The Federation cited her efforts to increase access to family planning, first as a physician with her own practice in Pakistan, then as director of Pakistan's national family planning service and finally at the United Nations Population Fund.

==== 2001 ====
In 2001, Planned Parenthood presented the annual Margaret Sanger Award to actress Kathleen Turner in Dallas, Texas. A statement from the organization stated that "millions of women, men and families have been affected by Kathleen Turner's advocacy for increased access to family planning." It went on to cite her "extraordinary efforts" for reproductive health issues. Widely recognized as one of the premier American actors in film and on the stage, Turner had chaired the Federation's Board of Advocates since 1995. She had been active in promoting Planned Parenthood's Responsible Choices Action Agenda through her active appearances at numerous events nationwide, lobbying and multimedia efforts.

==== 2003 ====
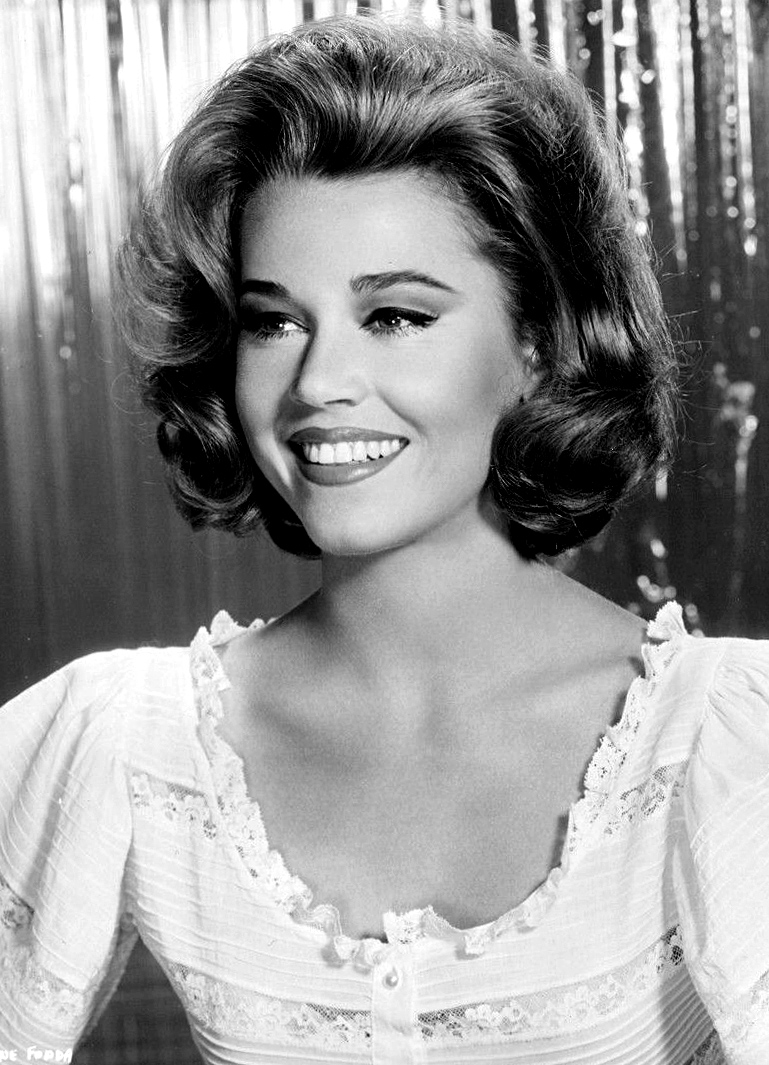
Jane Fonda

Jane Fonda received the 2003 Margaret Sanger Award at Planned Parenthood's annual Planned Parenthood Honors: A Salute to Courage, Integrity, and Leadership gala which culminated its annual conference in Portland, Oregon. Fonda received the award for her "passionate advocacy for reproductive rights and a leader in the field of teen pregnancy prevention." Upon receiving her award, Fonda said she was "going to help you [Planned Parenthood] raise lots of money for your 'Power the Promise' Campaign," continuing her advocacy for reproductive rights. She later went on to establish the Jane Fonda Center for Adolescent Reproductive Health at Emory University in Atlanta, Georgia the goal of which was to prevent adolescent pregnancy through training and program development.

==== 2004 ====
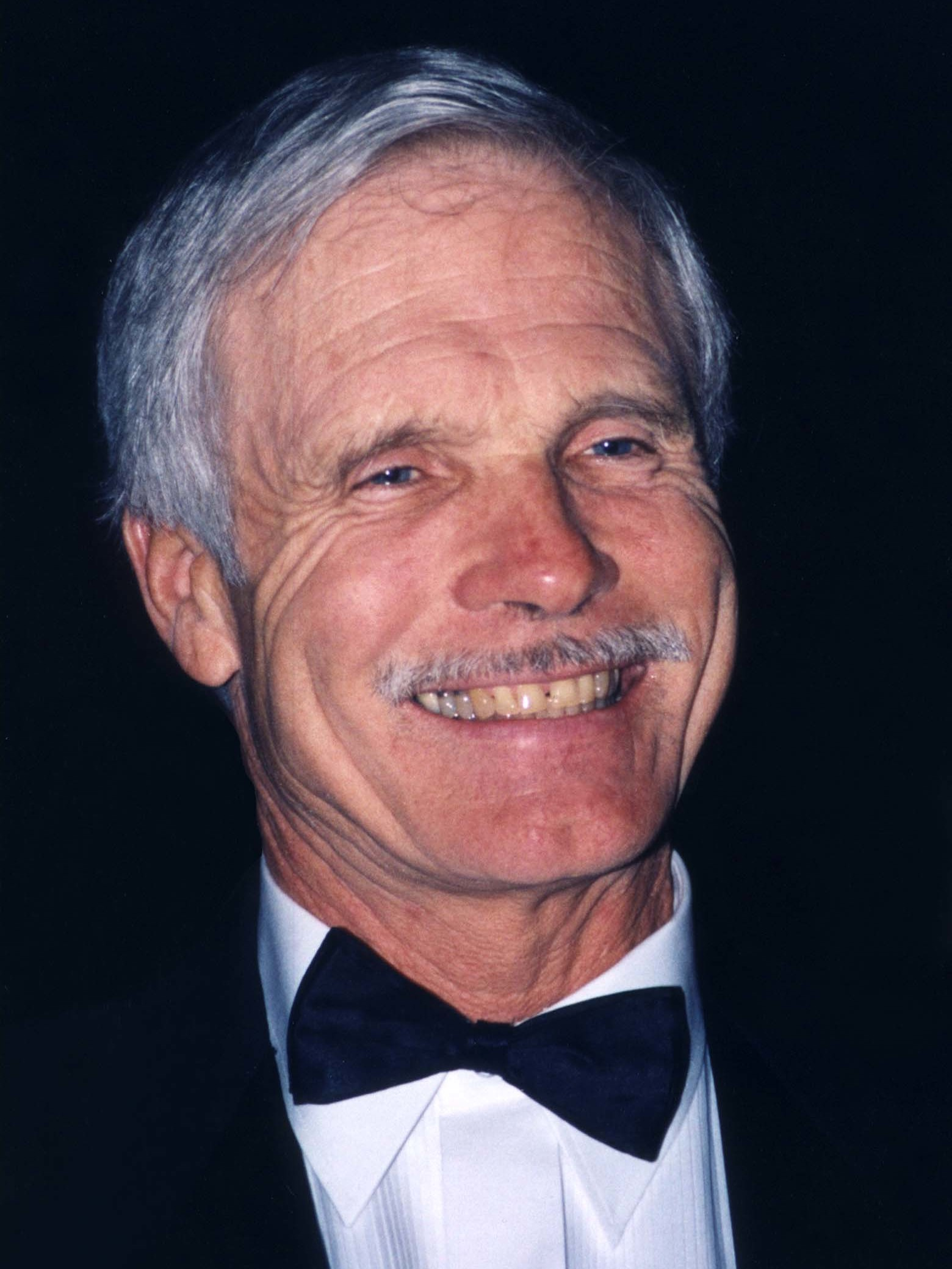
Ted Turner

Ted Turner, Forum for Women, Law, and Development of Nepal, Kisumu Medical and Educational Trust of Kenya, and television writer and producer René Balcer for the episode The Third Horseman of the series Law and Order Criminal Intent championing reproductive rights.

==== 2005 ====
Gloria Feldt, author, speaker, commentator, and feminist leader

==== 2006 ====
Karen Pearl and Allan Rosenfield, MD

==== 2007 ====
Dolores Huerta, labor leader and activist

==== 2008 ====
Kenneth C. Edelin, MD

==== 2009 ====
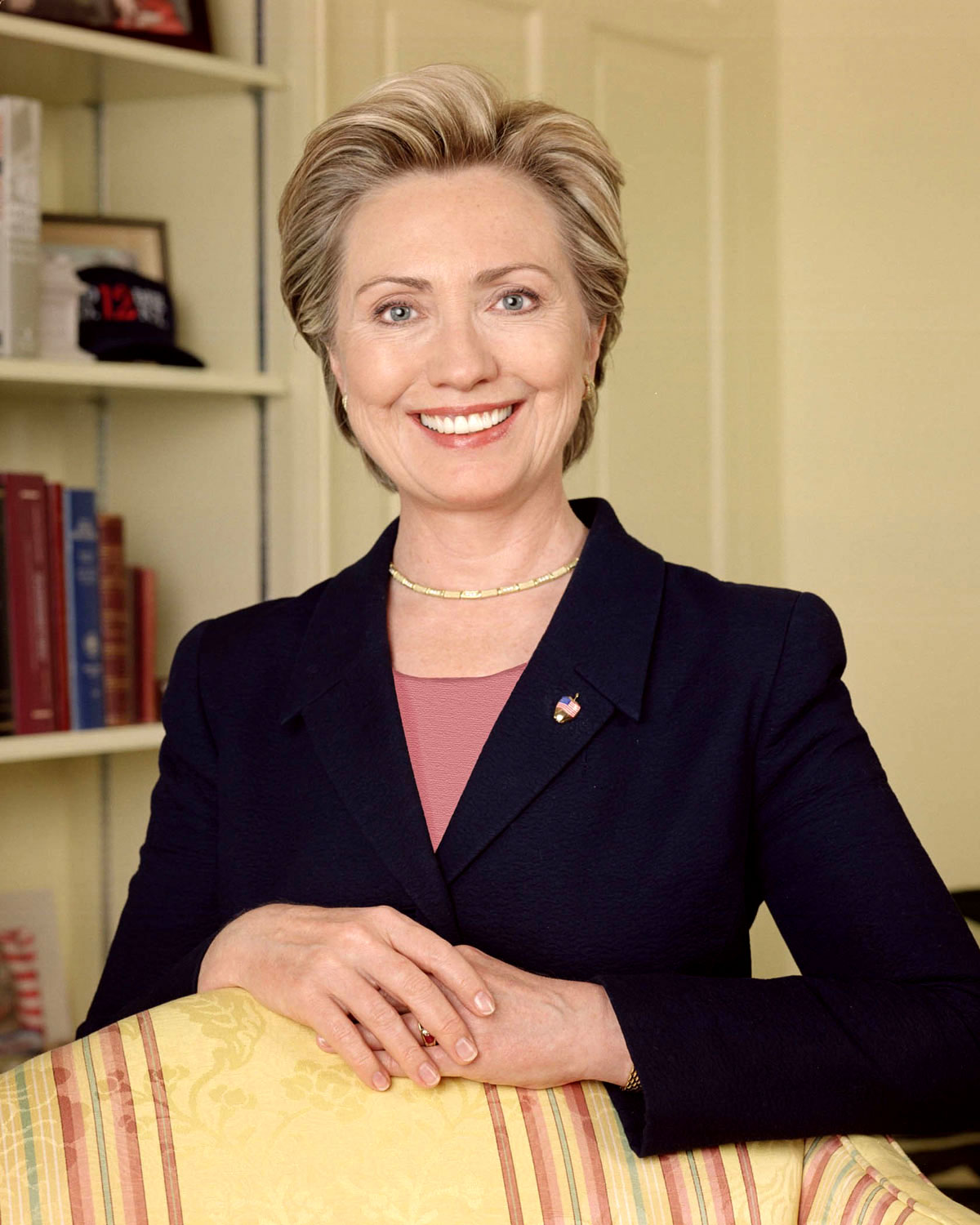
Hillary Clinton

U.S. Secretary of State Hillary Clinton

=== 2010s ===
==== 2010 ====
Ellen R. Malcolm, activist

==== 2011 ====
Anthony D. Romero, executive director of the American Civil Liberties Union

==== 2012 ====
Philip Darney, MD, MSc and Uta Landy, PhD

==== 2013 ====
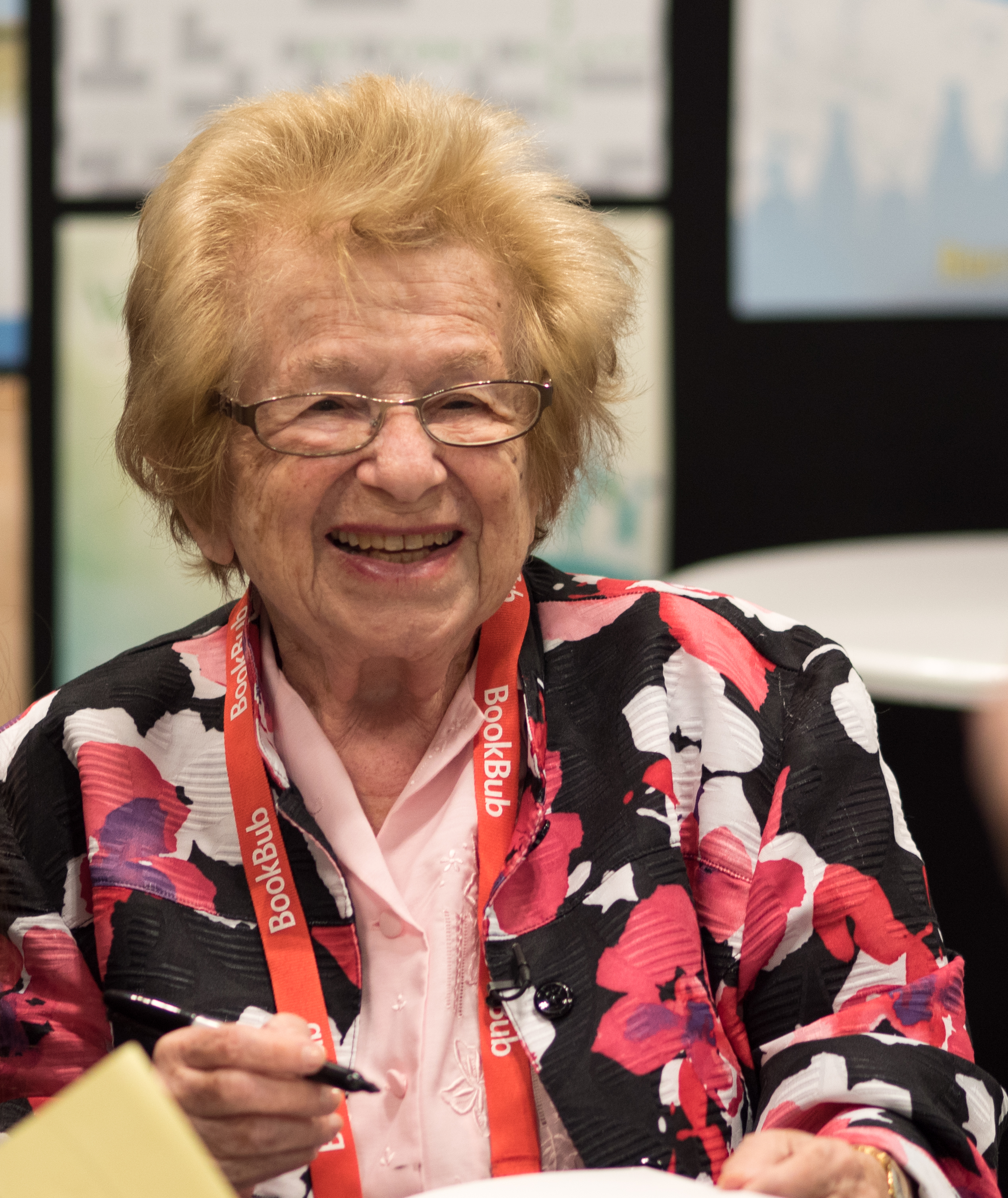
Dr. Ruth Westheimer

Dr. Ruth K. Westheimer (Dr. Ruth), German-American sex therapist, talk show host, author, professor, Holocaust survivor, and former Haganah sniper.

==== 2014 ====
Rep. Nancy Pelosi first made history in 2002 when the Democrats elected her the first woman to lead a major political party. Then, in 2007, Pelosi was elected the first woman to serve as Speaker of the House.

==== 2015 ====
Dr. Willie Parker, physician
