= Edris Rice-Wray Carson =

Medical researcher

Edris Rice-Wray
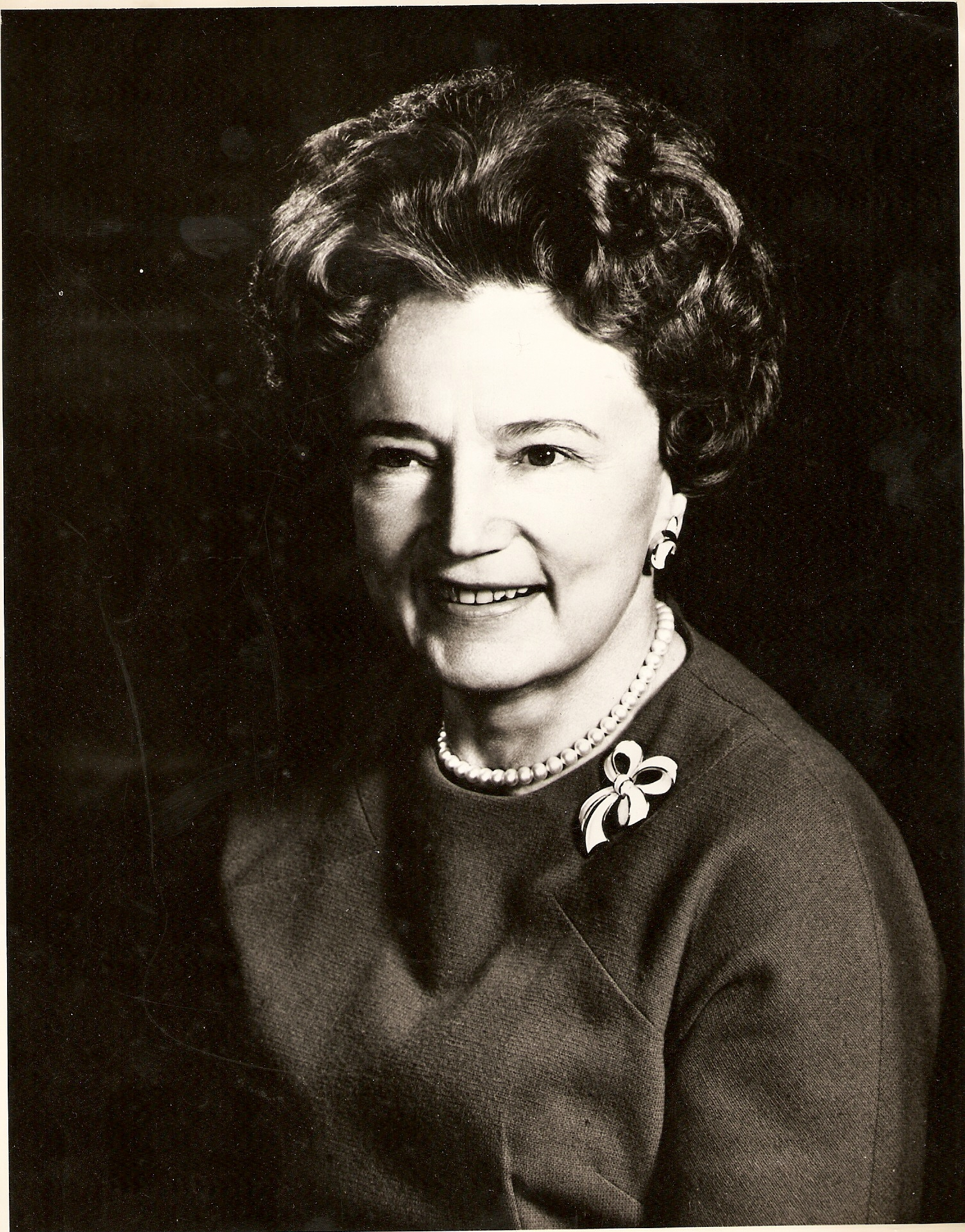
- Born: January 21, 1904; New York City, New York, United States
- Died: February 19, 1990 (aged 86); San Andres Cholula, Mexico
- Scientific career
- Fields: Contraception

Edris Roushan Rice-Wray (January 21, 1904 – February 19, 1990) was an American pioneer in medical research who was influential in studying the oral contraceptive pill. Rice-Way headed a large-scale clinical trial of the first birth control pill in the late 1950s in Puerto Rico.

== Background and education ==
She was born in New York City, New York. Rice-Wray attended Vassar College, where she specialized in public health, and graduated in 1927. She also attended Cornell University where she was a member of the Alpha Phi sorority. She received the Sesquicentennial Award for "knowledge, wisdom and courage of service" from the University of Michigan in 1967.

== Medical experience ==
Rice-Wray worked as a doctor at Northwestern University and had a long career working for the advancement of public health. She went to Puerto Rico in 1948 and was a faculty member of the Puerto Rico Medical School and medical director of the Puerto Rico Family Planning Association. It was there that she headed the first large-scale clinical trials working for over 17 years until the United Nations called her to work in Mexico.

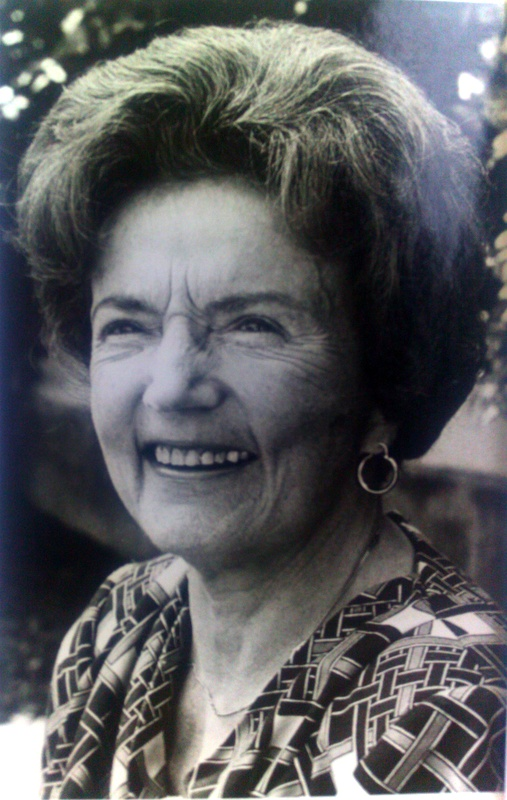
Rice-Wray at a conference in Mexicali

== Clinical trials and work on the birth control pill ==
In the early 1950s, Rice-Wray's work was focused on studying the effectiveness of the birth control pill. In order to prove the safety of the pill, researchers and activists including John Rock, Margaret Sanger and Katherine McCormick felt human trials had to be conducted. During this time Rice-Wray was working for the Puerto Rican Health Service. Puerto Rico was selected as the location for these trials in 1955 in part because there was an existing network of birth control clinics serving low-income women on the island and liberalized laws existed regarding distributing information about family planning. In 1937, a law had been passed in Puerto Rico that made it legal for married couples to receive advice about contraception. Since accessing the pill was legal, trials began there in 1956. In April 1956, Rice-Wray had been working with the Family Planning Association of Puerto Rico and joined this project. Some of the women who participated in the study received the first combined oral contraceptive pill, Enovid. In 1956, she started to distribute the pills. Rice-Wray noticed early on that there were potentially problematic side effects from the dosage in the early birth control pill. Her concerns were initially dismissed by Dr. Rock and Gregory Pincus, who argued the concerns raised by women were unfounded. Rice-Wray handled the fieldwork in the studies; however, she was eventually forced to leave her position in the Health Department as her studies were seen to conflict with it. She then went on to set up similar trials in Haiti and Mexico. In 1958 she founded Mexico's first family planning clinic in Mexico City. In Mexico she faced opposition from both the government and the Roman Catholic Church.

Rice-Wray saw a direct link between large family sizes and poverty. In 1955, she was reported as saying, "When all Puerto Rican parents can have the number of children they want and can properly care for, much of the misery and desperation of our poorer classes can be eliminated...then employment opportunities, schooling, housing, medical and welfare services will have a chance of meeting the needs of our people." Despite the controversial nature of fertility research, Rice-Wray's research was closely watched and reported on in the United States. In 1963, The New York Times reported on the details of her research as part of their coverage on a Planned Parenthood conference.

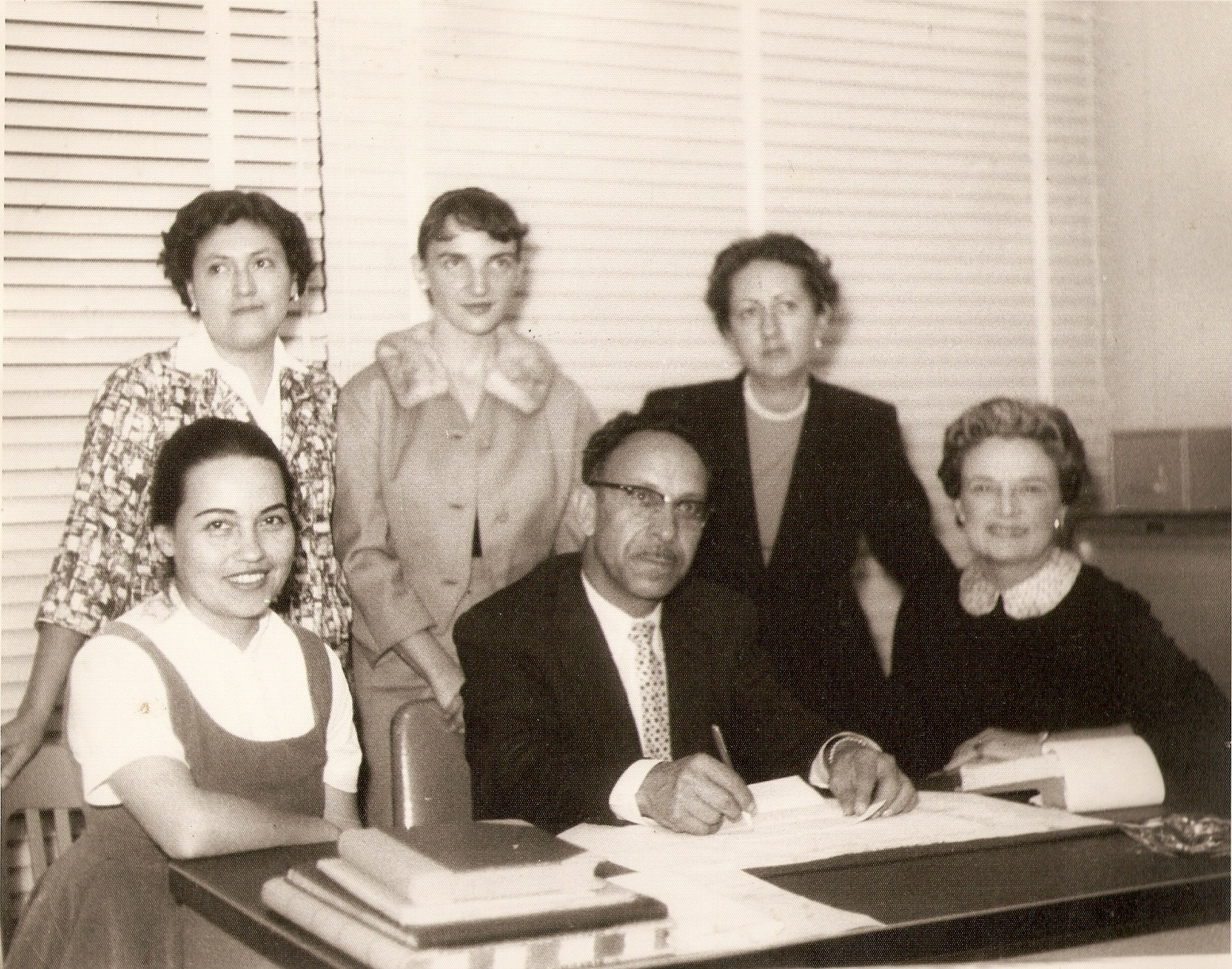
Prosalud Maternal Clinic Association

== Personal life ==
Rice-Wray was the daughter of Mabel and Theron Canfield Rice-Wray, who were married in 1903. Originally from New York City, Rice-Way spent much of her adult life in Mexico and Puerto Rico. Faith was an important aspect of her personal life. She was one of the early followers of the Baháʼí Faith in Mexico and obtained the rights to the Spanish translation of the Baháʼí Faith book Portals of Freedom while in Mexico.

== Awards and accolades ==
She received several awards for her work in publicizing the effectiveness and benefits of the pill in Latin America; she was the recipient of the Planned Parenthood Federation of America's award and received the Margaret Sanger Award in 1978. She showed a long-standing commitment to public health and wellness. Gregory Pincus, who was often credited with creating the pill, would often cite the work of Rice-Wray as being instrumental to its success.

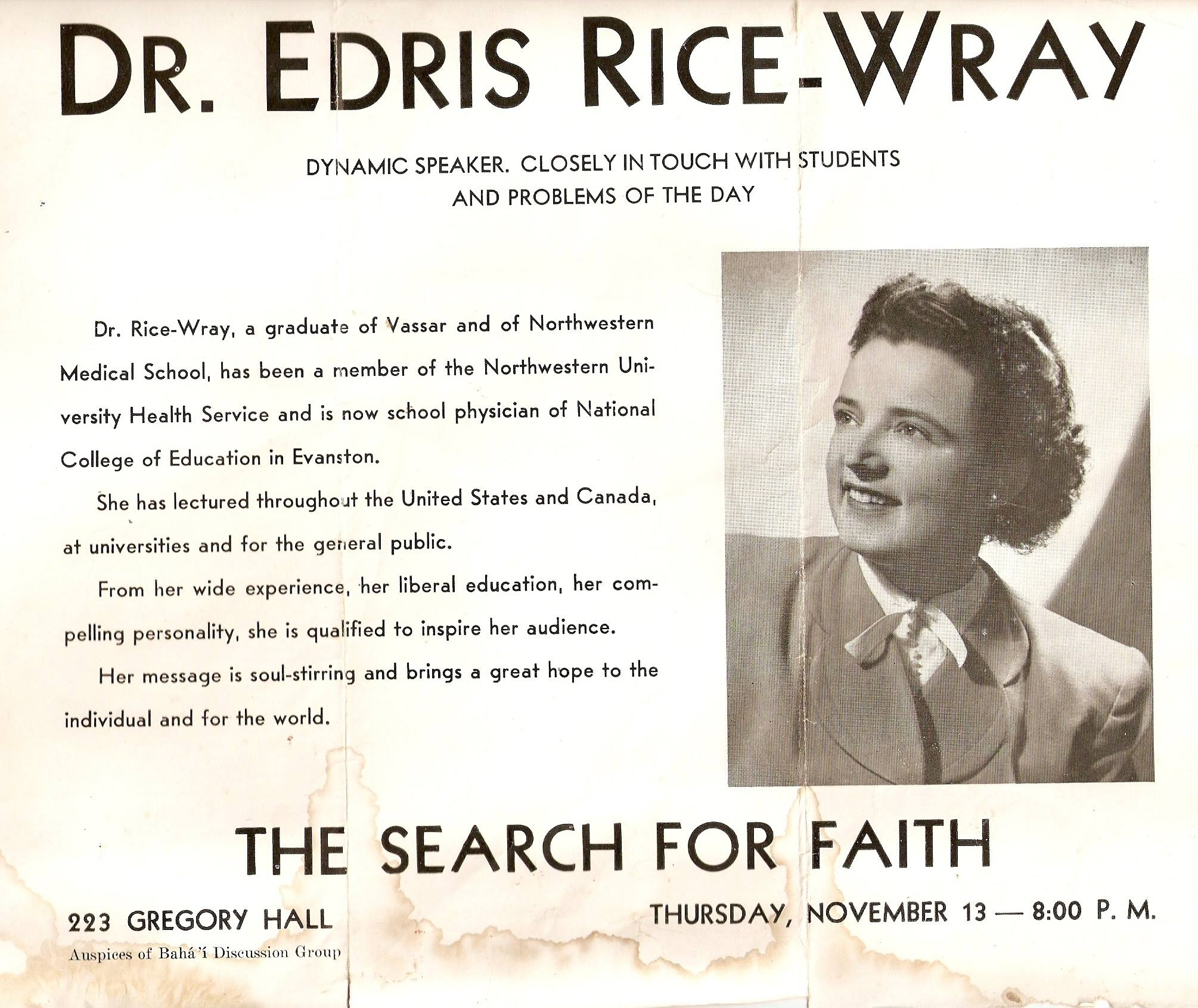
Edris Rice-Wray

By the 1970s she moved to Puebla, Mexico, in the municipality of Cholula where she worked as professor at UDLA (University of the Americas Puebla) in the fields of ecology, anthropology and population studies. Rice-Wray contributed her knowledge in medicine, including regarding the contraceptive pill, in San Pedro Cholula and San Andrés Cholula, Puebla.

== Global policy ==
She was one of the signatories of the agreement to convene a convention for drafting a world constitution. As a result, for the first time in human history, a World Constituent Assembly convened to draft and adopt the Constitution for the Federation of Earth.

== Later years ==
During the last days of her life, she lived in Cholula, Puebla, Mexico, and died at her home in San Andres Cholula, accompanied by her daughters and grandchildren in 1990.
