= Wang Yu-li =

Taiwanese biomedical engineer

Wang Yu-li (Chinese: 汪育理) is a Taiwanese biomedical engineer.

== Education and career ==
Wang attended National Taiwan University from 1969 to 1973, and earned a bachelor's of science degree in physics. Between 1975 and 1980, he was a student at Harvard University, where he obtained a doctorate in biophysics. Upon completing postdoctoral research at Harvard in 1982, Wang joined the National Jewish Hospital and Research Center as a staff scientist. In 1987, Wang joined the Worcester Foundation for Biomedical Research as a principal and senior scientist. Between 1997 and 2008, Wang was a professor of physiology at University of Massachusetts Medical School. He subsequently joined the Carnegie Mellon University faculty as Robert Mehrabian Professor of Biomedical Engineering, and served as head of the CMU biomedical engineering department until 2017.

== Awards and honors ==
Wang was elected a fellow of the American Institute for Medical and Biological Engineering in 2015, and a member of Academia Sinica in 2018.
