= Rosoff =

Rosoff is a surname. Notable people with the surname include:

- Jeannie I. Rosoff (1924–2014), American campaigner for reproductive rights
- Meg Rosoff (born 1956), UK-based American writer
- Sophia Rosoff (1924-2017), American pianist and educator

== See also ==
- Meanings of minor-planet names: 21001–22000#611
