= Miriam Menkin =

Latvian-American researcher

- Born: Miriam Friedman; August 8, 1901; Riga, Latvia, then part of Russian Empire
- Died: June 8, 1992 (aged 90); Boston, Massachusetts
- Resting place: Beth El Cemetery in Baker Street Jewish Cemeteries, Boston, Massachusetts
- Known for: In vitro fertilization research
- Spouse: Valy Menkin (m. 1924-1949)

Miriam Friedman Menkin (8 August 1901 – June 8, 1992), née Miriam Friedman, was an American scientist who was most famous for her in vitro fertilization (IVF) research with John Rock. In February 1944, she became the first person to conceive human life outside of the body.

Menkin was born on August 8, 1901, in Riga, Latvia, and died at the age of 90 on June 8, 1992, in Boston, Massachusetts . Her family relocated to the United States when she was young. Her father was a successful doctor in New York City, allowing her family to live securely. In 1922, Menkin graduated from Cornell University with an undergraduate degree in histology and comparative anatomy. She attended Columbia University for her graduate program and earned a master's degree in genetics only one year after graduating from Cornell. She taught biology and physiology for a short period while setting her sights on medical school. However, women were rarely admitted to medical school at the time and she was not accepted. Menkin married Valy Menkin, a Harvard medical student, in 1924. She still intended to earn a Ph.D. in biology, but she needed to provide financial support while her husband finished medical school. Thus, she obtained a second undergraduate degree in secretarial studies from Simmons College. Menkin ended up finishing the Harvard Ph.D. requirements two separate times but did not receive a degree because she could not afford the course fees.

Menkin and Valy had two children: a son named Gabriel and a daughter named Lucy.

== Early research (1930–1938) ==
Following a few years of work as a secretary, Menkin served as a pathology research fellow at Harvard Medical School from 1930 to 1935. She was then offered a job as a laboratory technician for Gregory Pincus at Harvard. While working for Pincus, Menkin was tasked with preparing extracts designed to superovulate rabbits in Pincus' quest to create "fatherless" rabbits. Pincus lost his tenure at Harvard in 1937, which left her without a job. She worked in the state laboratories of Massachusetts for a year and then applied for a research position with John Rock, a fertility doctor, at the Free Hospital for Women (now part of Brigham and Women's Hospital) in Boston. Pincus' rabbit experiments had been a factor in Rock's decision to start IVF research, and Menkin's role in the experiments caught Rock's eye. Rock soon hired Menkin and they set out to determine the exact time at which ovulation would occur. Rock had come up with the idea but had not made any meaningful progress in laboratory research before hiring Menkin. He did not have an advanced understanding of the technical aspects of egg fertilization and hired Menkin to oversee all of the laboratory work.

== IVF research and discovery (1938–1944) ==
Menkin began the IVF experiments in March 1938. Rock and Menkin requested that the women participating in the study, who were scheduled to undergo hysterectomies, have unprotected sex prior to the surgery. They elected to carry out the surgical procedures just before the patient would ovulate, which gave them many suitable ova for the study. Over the course of the study, Menkin followed a fairly steady weekly schedule: find eggs on Tuesday, add sperm on Wednesday, pray on Thursday, and observe the outcome using a microscope on Friday. Menkin called herself the 'egg chaser' because she would take the ovarian tissue from an operation and ran up three flights of stairs to the lab to look for eggs. She would then try to fertilize the eggs that she found with the 'left over' sperm. February 6, she finally fertilized her first egg. She made variations to the procedure every so often, altering the conditions the eggs were kept in and the length and concentration of the sperm samples. Menkin would find the unfertilized eggs in the ovaries that Rock removed from the patients, put the eggs in the solution, and then culture them before adding sperm. In the first 6 years of the study, Menkin tried many different strategies but did not achieve IVF. On February 3, 1944, she obtained an egg from a woman whose cervix and uterus prolapsed following the birth of four children. Menkin's standard protocol was to wash the sperm sample 3 times in solution and let the egg and sperm interact for 30 minutes. However, she had stayed up with her newborn daughter the night before, and on that day she mistakenly washed the sperm sample only once, used a more concentrated sample, and allowed one hour of interaction. The following Friday morning (February 6, 1944), Menkin found that cell cleavage had begun, which indicated that a fertilized egg had formed. Menkin neglected to take an immediate photograph of the discovery, and she could not find the egg when she finally went to get a picture. She was able to fertilize and photograph three more eggs, involving all three factors that she had altered before the original discovery. Rock and Menkin achieved two and three cell development in their successful fertilizations. After the additional eggs were fertilized successfully, Rock and Menkin elected to publish their work in a brief report. Science magazine published their findings in the article “In Vitro Fertilization and Cleavage of Human Ovarian Eggs" on August 4, 1944. The Associated Press, The New York Times, and Time magazine ran accounts of the discovery in the following days. The public perceived Rock and Menkin's discovery as a positive step toward assisting infertile couples in having children.

== Public reaction to discovery ==
Rock and Menkin's discovery was largely viewed by the public as a positive breakthrough that would help infertile couples have children. However, some critics saw it as playing God and interfering with the laws of nature, and because Rock and Menkin did not create a physical baby, others questioned if they had achieved in vitro fertilization at all. Rock and Menkin did not attempt to transfer their fertilized eggs into a woman's body after their achievement because it was not the goal of their study. The difficult task of transforming a multi-cell fertilized egg, like the one Menkin and Rock had created, into an embryo that could grow inside a woman's uterus was not successful until the birth of Louise Brown in 1978.

== Later years ==
At the time Science ran the article, Valy had recently been fired by Harvard and the Menkins had been forced to relocate to North Carolina. Menkin was able to stay in touch with Rock and work on additional publications. The full report of the discovery, in which Menkin was listed as the lead author, was finally published in 1948 with the same title, "In Vitro Fertilization and Cleavage of Human Ovarian Eggs", in the American Journal of Obstetrics and Gynecology. In the years before this, Menkin sought to continue IVF research on her own, but her opportunities were limited and unpaid.

Menkin divorced her husband in 1949. Supporting and caring for her daughter, Lucy, who had epilepsy, further limited her opportunities to do laboratory research. In 1950 she returned to Boston to enroll her in a special school and accepted an offer to return to Rock's laboratory. IVF research had ceased in Rock's lab since Menkin had departed, as he had been unable to find another scientist with the technical skill to continue Menkin's work. She attempted to revitalize it when she returned, but by that time Rock had shifted his primary focus to research on the birth control pill and Menkin was only able to work on IVF for a short time. She continued to work in Rock's lab, assisting him with his research and publications on contraception, but never received another opportunity to pursue IVF. Menkin died on June 8, 1992, in Boston, Massachusetts.

== Select publications ==
Rock, John; Menkin, Miriam F. (1944). "In Vitro Fertilization and Cleavage of Human Ovarian Eggs". Science. 100 (2588): 105–107. Bibcode:1944Sci...100..105R. doi:10.1126/science.100.2588.105. JSTOR 1672795. PMID 17788930.

- The original report on Rock and Menkin's IVF discovery.

Menkin, Miriam F.; Rock, John (1948). "In Vitro Fertilization and Cleavage of Human Ovarian Eggs". American Journal of Obstetrics and Gynecology. 55 (3): 440–452. doi:10.1016/S0002-9378(15)32963-X. PMID 18903892.

- The full report on the IVF discovery that was published 4 years after the original report.

Rock, John; García, Celso-Ramón; Menkin, Miriam F. (1959). "A Theory of Menstruation". Annals of the New York Academy of Sciences. 75 (2): 831–839. Bibcode:1959NYASA..75..831R. doi:10.1111/j.1749-6632.1959.tb44594.x. ISSN 1749-6632. PMID 13854539. S2CID 44933674.

- A discussion of why menstruation occurs and how it works. Largely focuses on the role of hormones in the process.

Hertig, Arthur T.; Adams, Eleanor C.; McKay, Donald G.; Rock, John; Mulligan, William J.; Menkin, Miriam F. (1958-11-01). "A thirteen-day human ovum studied histochemically". American Journal of Obstetrics and Gynecology. 76 (5): 1025–1043. doi:10.1016/0002-9378(58)90185-6. PMID 13583048.

- Discusses observations of a fertilized ovum removed in a hysterectomy on its fourteenth day of existence.

Dewan, Edmond M.; Menkin, Miriam F.; Rock, John (1978-05-01). "Effect of Photic Stimulation on the Human Menstrual Cycle". Photochemistry and Photobiology. 27 (5): 581–585. doi:10.1111/j.1751-1097.1978.tb07649.x. ISSN 1751-1097. PMID 674392. S2CID 19957895.

- Reports the results of an experiment testing the effectiveness of artificial light in regulating the menstrual cycle.

Rock, John; Menkin, Miriam F. (1942-10-08). "Stilbestrol". New England Journal of Medicine. 227 (15): 552–556. doi:10.1056/NEJM194210082271505. ISSN 0028-4793. PMID 14461256.

- Examines the drug stilbestrol (now known as diethylstilbestrol), which was incorrectly used to lower the risk of pregnancy complications in the mid-19th century. It is now known that the drug increases the risk of breast cancer.
