= Cumulina =

First animal cloned from adult cells that survived to adulthood

Cumulina (October 3, 1997 - May 5, 2000), a mouse, was the first animal cloned from adult cells that survived to adulthood. She was cloned using the Honolulu technique developed by "Team Yana", the Ryuzo Yanagimachi research group at the former campus of the John A. Burns School of Medicine located at the University of Hawai'i at Mānoa. Cumulina was a brown Mus musculus or common house mouse. She was named after the cumulus cells surrounding the developing oocyte in the ovarian follicle in mice. Nuclei from these cells were put into egg cell devoid of their original nuclei in the Honolulu cloning technique. All other mice produced by the Yanagimachi lab are just known by a number.

Cumulina was able to produce two healthy litters. She was retired after the second.

Cumulina's preserved remains were displayed at the Institute for Biogenesis Research, a part of the John A. Burns School of Medicine laboratory, in Honolulu, Hawaii until 2022 when they were donated to the Smithsonian Institution's National Museum of American History.

Some of her descendants have been displayed at the Bishop Museum and the Museum of Science and Industry in Chicago, Illinois.

== See also ==
- List of cloned animals
