= Betty Mary Goetting =

Librarian, women's rights activist in El Paso, Texas

- Born: Betty Mary Smith; 1897; Jefferson, Texas
- Died: 1980; El Paso, Texas
- Citizenship: United States
- Occupation: Librarian
- Employer: El Paso Public Library
- Known for: Bringing birth control and Planned Parenthood to El Paso, Texas.

Betty Mary Goetting (née Smith 1897–1980) was an American librarian, civic leader and women's rights activist. She is known for bringing Planned Parenthood to El Paso, Texas.

== Biography ==
Goetting was born 1897 in Jefferson, Texas. She and her family moved to El Paso in 1910. In 1913, she started working at the El Paso Public Library and became close to librarian, Maud Durlin Sullivan. In 1915, she graduated from El Paso High School and then went to California to attend the Riverside Library Service School in 1917.

Goetting was appointed as an assistant at the New York Reference Library in 1918. While in New York, Goetting got involved with the Women's Suffrage movement and the birth control movement. She returned to El Paso in 1919 and married Charles A. Goetting.

Goetting became very involved in social groups starting in the 1920s. Some of her involvement in the social world were merely for fun, like the Saturday Bridge Club. Goetting had other interests, such as history and reading. She created the first book club in El paso and co-founded the History Club in El Paso in 1926. Later, she became a charter member of the El Paso Historical Society (EPHS). She was a curator for EPHS for over 15 years. She was also a frequent contributor to their newsletter, Passwords.

Goetting met Margaret Sanger in 1937 when she spoke "to a packed house" at the Paso del Norte Hotel. Sanger and Goetting became close, Goetting often hosting her at her home. Goetting recognized a need for birth control services in El Paso and wanted to start a clinic. She began to search for rental property, but "as soon as property owners knew what the property was to be used for, prices doubled." With the help of her family, the clergy and several doctors she finally set up the first clinic in 1937, called the El Paso Mother's Health Center (later Planned Parenthood Center of El Paso.) By 1938, they had helped 731 patients in under a year. Sanger wrote to Goetting that year, praising her work. 1939, they changed the name to the El Paso Birth Control Clinic. In 1940, she helped open an axillary clinic in 1940 and by 1954, she had three facilities and all of them affiliated with Planned Parenthood of America.

In 1966, she was presented with the National Margaret Sanger Award for her work in promoting birth control. In 1970, she received a Presidential Award for her work as a curator for the EPHS. Goetting continued to fight for women's access to birth control until her death in 1980. In 2009, Goetting was inducted into the Hall of Honor, presented by the El Paso County Historical Society.
