= Mestranol/norethisterone =

Combined oral contraceptive medication

Combination of
- Mestranol: Estrogen
- Norethisterone: Progestogen

Clinical data
- Trade names: Norethin, Noriday, Norinyl, Norquen, Ortho-Novum, others
- AHFS/Drugs.com: Monograph
- Routes of administration: By mouth
- ATC code: None

Legal status
- Legal status: US: ℞-only

Identifiers
- CAS Number: 8015-29-0
- PubChem CID: 63022
- CompTox Dashboard (EPA): DTXSID901000997

Mestranol/norethisterone (brand names Norethin, Noriday, Norinyl, Norquen, Ortho-Novum, others) is a combination of the estrogen estranol and the progestin norethisterone (norethindrone) which was introduced in 1963 and was the second combined oral contraceptive to be marketed, following mestranol/noretynodrel in 1960. Although most mestranol-containing oral contraceptive formulations have been discontinued, the combination remains available today in the United States in a single formulation under the brand name Norinyl 1+50 28-Day. It has largely been superseded by ethinylestradiol/norethisterone, which has been marketed under many of the same brand names.

== See also ==
- Birth control pill formulations
- List of combined sex-hormonal preparations
