= Christopher Tietze =

American physician and abortion rights advocate

Christopher Tietze (1908 – April 4, 1984) was a United States physician best known for his stance in the United States pro-choice movement to permit abortion in the United States.

== Biography ==
Christopher Tietze was born in Vienna. He graduated from the medical school at the University of Vienna. In 1938 he came to the United States.

In 1967 he joined the biomedical division of the Population Council. He was a member of seven organizations in the World Health Organization which recommended policy on human reproduction. He criticized attempts to limit access to abortion.

He died on April 4, 1984, at age 75.

== Recognition ==
In 1973 he and his wife Sarat Lewit Tietze won the Margaret Sanger Award of the Planned Parenthood Federation of America. In 1977 he won the American Public Health Association's Carl Schultz Award.

The National Abortion Federation grants the Christopher Tietze Humanitarian Award annually to the person or organization which it recognizes as having advanced its organizational mission.

== Selected biography ==
- Lincoln, Richard (1987). Sarah L. Tietze; Richard Lincoln (eds.). Fertility regulation and the public health : selected papers of Christopher Tietze. New York: Springer-Verlag. ISBN 978-0387964508.
- Tietze, Christopher; Lewit, Sarah (June 1972). "Joint Program for the Study of Abortion (JPSA): Early Medical Complications of Legal Abortion". Studies in Family Planning Joint Program for the Study of Abortion. 3 (6). Population Council: 97–123. doi:10.2307/1965375. JSTOR 1965375.
- Tietze, C.; Murstein, M. C. (1975). "Induced abortion: 1975 factbook". Reports on Population/Family Planning (14): 1–75. PMID 56023.
- Tietze, Christopher (1973). "Two Years' Experience with a Liberal Abortion Law: Its Impact on Fertility Trends in New York City". Family Planning Perspectives. 5 (1). Guttmacher Institute: 36–41. doi:10.2307/2133799. JSTOR 2133799. PMID 4805715.
