= Hudson Hoagland =

American neuroscientist

Hudson Hoagland (December 5, 1899 – March 4, 1982) was an American neuroscientist, president of the American Academy of Arts and Sciences, from 1961 to 1964.

Originally from Rockaway, New Jersey, he graduated from Columbia University, Massachusetts Institute of Technology, and Harvard University, and was a Guggenheim fellow. His scientific specialty was electroencephalography. He died in 1982 in Southboro, Massachusetts.

== Legacy ==
In 1965, Hoagland was named the Humanist of the Year by the American Humanist Association.

In 1985, he co-founded the Worcester Foundation, now merged with the University of Massachusetts Medical School. The foundation funds biomedical research at Chan Medical School, a foundation that developed the birth control pill.

== Works ==
- Hoagland, Hudson (July 1949). "Schizophrenia and Stress". Scientific American. doi:10.1038/scientificamerican0749-44.
- Hoagland, Hudson (1964). "Science and the New Humanism". Science. 143: 111–114. doi:10.1126/science.143.3602.111.
