= Jeannie I. Rosoff =

Jeannie I. Rosoff (November 8, 1924 – May 12, 2014) was a US campaigner for reproductive rights.

== Institute and program ==
Rosoff was the president and CEO of the Guttmacher Institute. She focused on the needs of low-income and disadvantaged groups and worked on the creation of the Title X program. She served with distinction as a private-sector member of the US delegation to the International Conference on Population and Development in Cairo.

== Presidential recognition ==
When Rosoff retired in 1999, President Bill Clinton sent his congratulations in a letter that said, in part, "Through three decades of challenge and change, you have been a steadfast champion of reproductive rights, particularly for the young and disadvantaged. You can be proud to know that your efforts have improved the lives and health of women and their families across America and around the world."

== Articles and awards ==
She is the author of many articles on family planning, women's rights, population and government programs. She has received various awards including the Carl S. Schultz award of the American Public Health Association in 1980 and the Margaret Sanger Award of the Planned Parenthood Federation of America in 1986.
