= Gregory G. Pincus =

American biochemist (1903–1967), inventor of the contraceptive pill

Gregory Goodwin Pincus
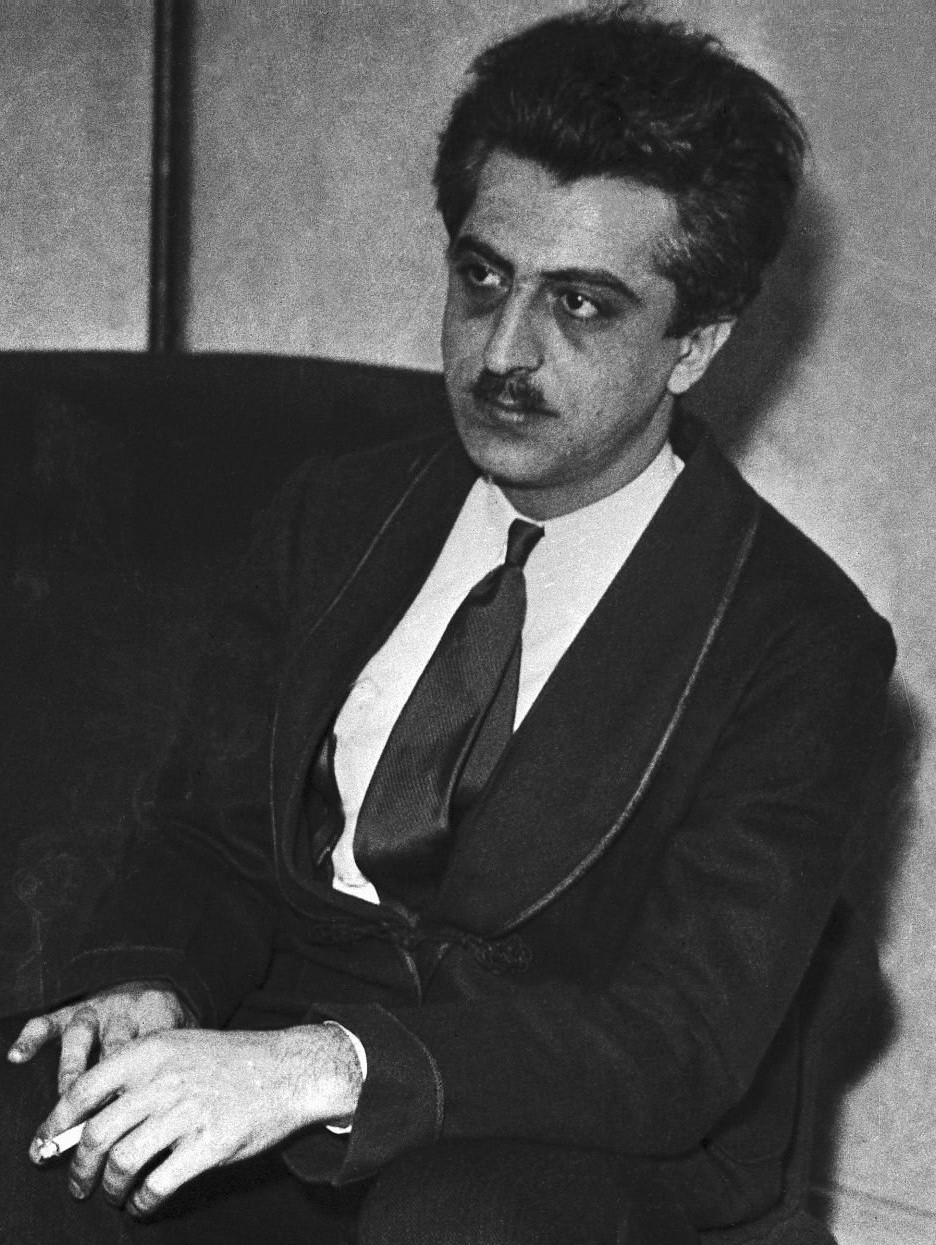
- Pincus, 1930s
- Born: April 9, 1903; Woodbine, New Jersey, U.S.
- Died: August 22, 1967 (aged 64); Boston, Massachusetts, U.S.
- Education: Cornell University; Harvard University
- Known for: Combined oral contraceptive pill
- Spouse: Elizabeth Notkin (died 1988)
- Children: 2
- Awards: Cameron Prize for Therapeutics of the University of Edinburgh (1966)
- Scientific career
- Fields: Biology
- Workplaces: Harvard University; Worcester Foundation for Experimental Biology

Gregory Goodwin Pincus (April 9, 1903 – August 22, 1967) was an American biologist and researcher who co-invented the combined oral contraceptive pill.

== Early life ==
Pincus was one of five siblings born in Woodbine, New Jersey, to immigrant parents of Russian Jewish origin. His father was Joseph Pincus, a teacher and the editor of a farm journal, and his mother was Elizabeth (née Lipman), whose family had come from the region that is now Latvia. Pincus's IQ was said to be 210, and his family considered him a genius.

== Research ==
Pincus began studying hormonal biology and steroidal hormones early in his career. He was interested in the way that hormones affected mammalian reproductive systems. His first breakthrough came when he was able to produce in vitro fertilization in rabbits in 1934. In 1936, he published his experiments' results. His experiments involving parthenogenesis produced a rabbit that appeared on the cover of Look magazine in 1937. To create the in-vitro rabbit offspring, Pincus removed the ovum from the mother rabbit and placed it in a solution mixture of saline and estrone. Afterwards, he placed the "fertilized" ovum back into the rabbit. Pincus's experiment became known as "Pincogenesis" because other scientists were unable to reproduce Pincus's results. After he was misquoted in an interview, it was believed that his experiment was the beginning of the use of in vitro fertilization by humans.

In 1944, Pincus co-founded the Worcester Foundation for Experimental Biology in Shrewsbury, Massachusetts. He wanted to continue his research on the relationship between hormones and conditions such as (but not limited to) cancer, heart disease, and schizophrenia. By the end of the 1960s, more than 300 international researchers came to participate in the Worcester Foundation of Experimental Biology.

Pincus remained interested in mammalian reproduction systems and began to research infertility. In 1951, Margaret Sanger met Pincus at a dinner hosted by Abraham Stone, the director of the Margaret Sanger Research Bureau and medical director and vice president of the Planned Parenthood Federation of America (PPFA), and procured a small grant from the PPFA for Pincus to begin hormonal contraceptive research. Pincus, along with Min Chueh Chang, confirmed earlier research that progesterone would act as an inhibitor to ovulation.

In 1952, Sanger told her friend Katharine McCormick about Pincus and Chang's research. Frustrated by PPFA's meager interest and support, McCormick and Sanger met with Pincus in 1953 to dramatically expand the scope of the research with a 50-fold increase in funding from McCormick. Pincus was interested by Sanger's work with impoverished women with histories of many pregnancies. Sanger indirectly influenced him to create a successful contraceptive to prevent unwanted pregnancies.

In order to prove the safety of "the pill," human trials had to be conducted. These were initiated among infertility patients of John Rock in Brookline, Massachusetts, using progesterone in 1953 and then three different progestins in 1954. Puerto Rico was selected as a trial site in 1955, in part because there was an existing network of 67 birth control clinics serving low-income women on the island. Trials began there in 1956 and were supervised by Edris Rice-Wray and Celso-Ramón García.

Some of the women experienced side effects from the trial medication (Enovid), and Rice-Wray reported to Pincus that Enovid "gives one hundred percent protection against pregnancy [but causes] too many side reactions to be acceptable". Pincus and Rock disagreed with Rice-Wray based on their experience with patients in Massachusetts and their research found that placebos caused similar side effects. Subsequently, trials were expanded to Haiti, Mexico, and Los Angeles—despite high attrition—to accommodate rising interest. In May 1960, the American Food and Drug Administration extended Enovid's approved indications to include contraception.

== Personal life ==
Pincus married Elizabeth Notkin (1900–1988) in 1924 and they had two children together.

== Awards ==
Pincus was the recipient of numerous awards for his research. He was awarded the Oliver Bird Prize in 1960; the Julius A. Koch Award in 1962; the Cameron Prize for Therapeutics of the University of Edinburgh in 1966; and the American Medical Association’s Scientific Achievement Award in 1967.

Pincus was acknowledged for his creation of the Laurentian Hormone Conference (which was a conference of endocrinologists). He served as the chairman of the conference, and its purpose was to discuss the hormones of the endocrine system. The conference was attended by endocrinologists from all over the world.

== Death ==
He died in 1967 of myeloid metaplasia, a blood cancer, in Boston, Massachusetts. He was 64 years old and lived in Northborough, Massachusetts. His funeral was held August 25, 1967 at Temple Emanuel in Worcester, Massachusetts.

== Lasting impact ==
Pincus' birth control pill changed family life in a significant way, because it allowed women to choose—for the first time—when they would have children and plan accordingly around this decision in a deliberate manner. The birth control pill helped pave the way for the women's liberation and concomitant Sexual Revolution movements.

== See also ==
- Birth control movement in the United States
