= John Rock (physician) =

American gynecologist (1890–1984)

- Born: John Charles Rock; March 24, 1890; Marlborough, Massachusetts, U.S.
- Died: December 4, 1984 (aged 94); Peterborough, New Hampshire, U.S.
- Education: Harvard University; Harvard Medical School
- Medical career
- Field: Obstetrics and Gynecology
- Institutions: Free Hospital for Women Harvard Medical School Rock Reproductive Clinic
- Sub-specialties: Reproductive medicine
- Research: Birth control pill and in vitro fertilization

John Charles Rock (March 24, 1890 – December 4, 1984) was an American obstetrician and gynecologist. He is best known for the major role he played in the development of the first birth control pill.

He was the founder of the Rock Reproductive Study Center at the Free Hospital for Women in Brookline, Massachusetts and a Clinical Professor of Gynecology at Harvard Medical School. He was appointed director of the Sterility Clinic at the Free Hospital for Women and would hold this position for thirty more years.

Rock was a known scientist, obstetrician, and gynecologist, but he was also an author who wrote a few books after he discovered the contraceptive pill. Before discovering the first contraceptive method, he did not express an interest in pharmacology. Rock was also a pioneer in in vitro fertilization and sperm freezing. He helped many of his patients achieve pregnancy and became known as a "ground-breaking infertility specialist".

== Early life ==
John Charles Rock was born on March 24, 1890, in Marlborough, Massachusetts. He was born into a Roman Catholic family and was one of four children.

During his early years at the High School of Commerce in Boston, he had a desire to pursue a business career. He worked on plantations for the United Fruit Company in Guatemala and for an engineering firm in Rhode Island and realized that business was not his calling. He became friends with the company's doctor, Neil MacPhail, who mentored Rock and allowed him to assist in surgeries at the hospital he managed.

In 1912, Rock attended Harvard University, receiving his bachelor's degree in 1915. He then attended and graduated from Harvard University Medical School in 1918.

== Career ==
Rock originally planned to specialize in nervous disorders. However, he decided to change it to obstetrics and gynecology. and founded his own medical practice a few years later

As his career progressed, and despite being a devout Catholic, Rock also became known for his acceptance of birth control. (Birth control was illegal in Massachusetts until the 1965 Supreme Court case Griswold v. Connecticut.) In the 1930s, he founded a clinic to teach the rhythm method, the only birth control conditionally regarded as moral by the Catholic Church at the time. In 1931, Rock was the only Catholic physician to sign a petition to legalize birth control. In the 1940s, he taught at Harvard Medical School—and included birth control methods in his curriculum. Rock also coauthored a birth control guide for the general reader, titled Voluntary Parenthood and published in 1949.

For most of Rock's medical career, he directed and practiced at the Fertility and Endocrine Clinic at the Free Hospital for Women in Boston, Massachusetts. In addition to practicing as a medical doctor, he was an active researcher, striving to discover new knowledge and offer more help to his female patients. In collaboration with Marshall Bartlett, Rock conducted research on the schedule of ovulation and the sequential stages of the endometrium during a woman's menstrual cycle. Rock's research throughout the 1930s to 1950s focused on two large projects that advanced reproductive medicine.

Working with Arthur Hertig, Rock identified implantation and the following stages of embryonic development. At this time, no one knew how, where, or when a woman's eggs were fertilized. In another project, with Miriam Menkin as his assistant, they researched human in vitro fertilization. Their study reported in 1944 that eggs fertilized outside the human body had successfully initiated embryonic cleavage for the first time in a lab setting. The report obtained national attention and was dubbed “test-tube fertilization”. This research opened a door of possibilities for future technology to overcome obstacles in reproductive medicine, providing hope to many women experiencing infertility. Although Rock and Menkin's findings were groundbreaking, the research for in vitro fertilization was not advanced and safe enough to be used in clinical practice until many decades later. These two major studies with Hertig and Menkin were just the beginning of the research and developments that were to come in the field of reproductive medicine for decades.

=== In vitro fertilization ===
Gregory Pincus began his research on in vitro fertilization in rabbits in the early 1930s and announced his success in creating offspring via in vitro fertilization just a few years later. With IVF already being controversial, Pincus's findings resulted in negative publicity. Consequently, he was denied tenure and, ultimately, fired from his Harvard position. Although Pincus was no longer an employee of Harvard and conducting research anymore, the results of Pincus's experiment inspired Rock to apply the findings to human conception.

Rock hired Miriam Menkin, a research technician who assisted Gregory Pincus in the rabbit IVF experiments. They researched and experimented for six years until, finally, on February 6, 1944, Menkin fertilized her first egg. When a procedure to preserve the specimen was not decided on quickly enough, the egg disappeared. Not long after, Menkin fertilized three eggs properly preserved them, and took pictures. Rock announced their accomplishment and received some skepticism and doubt from other scientists and notable zoologist, Carl Hartman. Not until a baby was born in 1978, did fellow scientists, researchers, and the public attribute the first human in vitro fertilization to Rock and Menkin.

To help women struggling with infertility, Rock's principal objective was to develop a fetus in an artificial womb. He believed in vitro fertilization would help women all over the country who were infertile and could not have children. Rock was known for being caring, respectful, and honest with his patients who badly wanted to conceive a child. Towards the end of the 1940s, Rock received letters from several women from across the United states who wanted to try in vitro fertilization. Since there were still a multitude of questions about the process of IVF that needed to be answered and technology that needed to be developed, Rock tried to convey that IVF pregnancies were not likely.

With the likelihood of IVF pregnancies still being decades down the road, he took a step back from his IVF research and entertained alternative infertility treatments.

=== Birth control ===
In 1951 and 1952, Margaret Sanger arranged for funding for Pincus's research of hormonal contraception. In 1952, Rock was recruited to investigate the clinical use of progesterone to prevent ovulation. In 1955, the team announced the successful clinical use of progestins to prevent ovulation. Enovid, the brand name of the first pill, was approved by the U.S. Food and Drug Administration (FDA) and put on the market in 1957 as a menstrual regulator. In 1960, Enovid gained approval from the FDA for contraceptive use.

Rock was seventy years old when Enovid was approved for contraceptive use. Over the next eight years, Rock campaigned vigorously for Roman Catholic approval of the pill. He published a book, The Time Has Come: A Catholic Doctor's Proposals to End the Battle over Birth Control, and was subsequently featured in Time and Newsweek, and gave a one-hour interview to NBC. In 1958, Pope Pius XII declared that the use of the pill to treat menstrual disorders was not contrary to Catholic morals. Rock believed it was only a matter of time before the Catholic Church approved its use as a contraceptive.

In 1968, the papal encyclical Humanae vitae laid out definitively the Catholic Church's opposition to hormonal and all other artificial means of contraception. Rock was profoundly disappointed. Consequently, he withdrew from the church that he loved so much.

Although it has been claimed by some journalists that Rock was to blame for adding "unnecessary" breaks in the use of the pill (instructing one week of taking placebo sugar pills every month), Jane Dickson of the Faculty of Sexual and Reproductive Healthcare of RCOG stated in an interview that there were many more reasons for a placebo period, including as a recovery period from the then high dosage of hormones from the pill, and as reassurance that in having menstrual flow (although it was not a true period) one was not pregnant.

=== Clinical trials ===
The initial clinical trials were codeveloped by Rock and were funded by Katherine McCormick, a collaborator of Sanger who dreamed of the creation of a female-controlled contraceptive method. With this funding, Pincus joined Rock to observe contraceptive effects of progesterone on Rock's female patients.

In 1954, the two doctors began their first trials on fifty women in Massachusetts. Rock and Pincus used an oral contraceptive pill containing synthetic progesterone supplied by a pharmaceutical company, Searle. These trials occurred under what appeared to be considered a fertility study, as contraception was illegal in Massachusetts. The pill containing progesterone was taken by women for 21 days followed by a seven-day break. Rock and Pincus wanted to give the body an opportunity for menstruation so that this drug would not conflict with the natural biological processes in women. The concluding results revealed no ovulation occurred in any of the women during drug administration.

Rock's written scientific research explained how this drug succeeded in inhibiting ovulation, but skepticism remained present among authorities. To provide further evidence of their developed oral contraceptive pill, Pincus and Rock moved their studies to Puerto Rico to conduct their trials on a larger scale in 1956. The pill was reported successful regarding preventative purposes but brought too many side effects for legal consideration, which was stated by the medical director of the clinical trials in Puerto Rico. While Pincus believed that only a few, mild side effects would come about, roughly half of the participants in the study dropped out due to side effects like severe headaches, nausea, and vomiting.

It was noticed after that the transportation of pills from Searle was contaminated, due to a mixture of synthetic estrogen with the progesterone. This was an obstacle for the two doctors, but their further research and testing revealed the addition of estrogen in combination with progesterone can help reduce menstrual comfort.

In 1960, the Food and Drug Administration (FDA) approved the use of the oral contraceptive, developed by Rock and Pincus. This female-controlled contraceptive method, known as the Pill, became a rapid, nationwide use for protection against pregnancy.

== Later years ==
In later years, Rock and Menkin would receive many letters from people about Rock's early optimism for how long it would take for IVF to be used in the clinic. Rock was said to have been filled with sadness as he had to inform women that the IVF technology would not be ready in time. He had then predicted that it would be decades before in vitro fertilization was used to successfully make women pregnant. After realizing he could no longer contribute to the IVF project, Rock decided to move on. He wanted to develop a more successful way of opening blocked fallopian tubes, therefore his last idea before abandoning his research was the creation of artificial or plastic fallopian tubes.

Rock retired in 1969 from his practice. After his retirement, he founded the independent Rock Reproductive Study Center, later renamed as Rock Reproductive Clinic, Inc., in Brookline, Massachusetts. This center was known to focus on fertility, sterility, and the development of the oral contraceptives, now known as the birth control pill. He remained working at the clinic until around the late 1960s and eventually sold his practice to Dr. John H. Derry of Newton who renamed it to Derry-Rock Clinic in Roxbury, Massachusetts.

== Personal life ==
Rock married Anna Thorndike in 1928. They raised five children.

After retiring, Rock moved into a farmhouse in Temple, New Hampshire. He died in Peterborough, New Hampshire on December 4, 1984, at the age of 94 from myocardial infarction.
