= Mestranol/noretynodrel =

Combined oral contraceptive medication

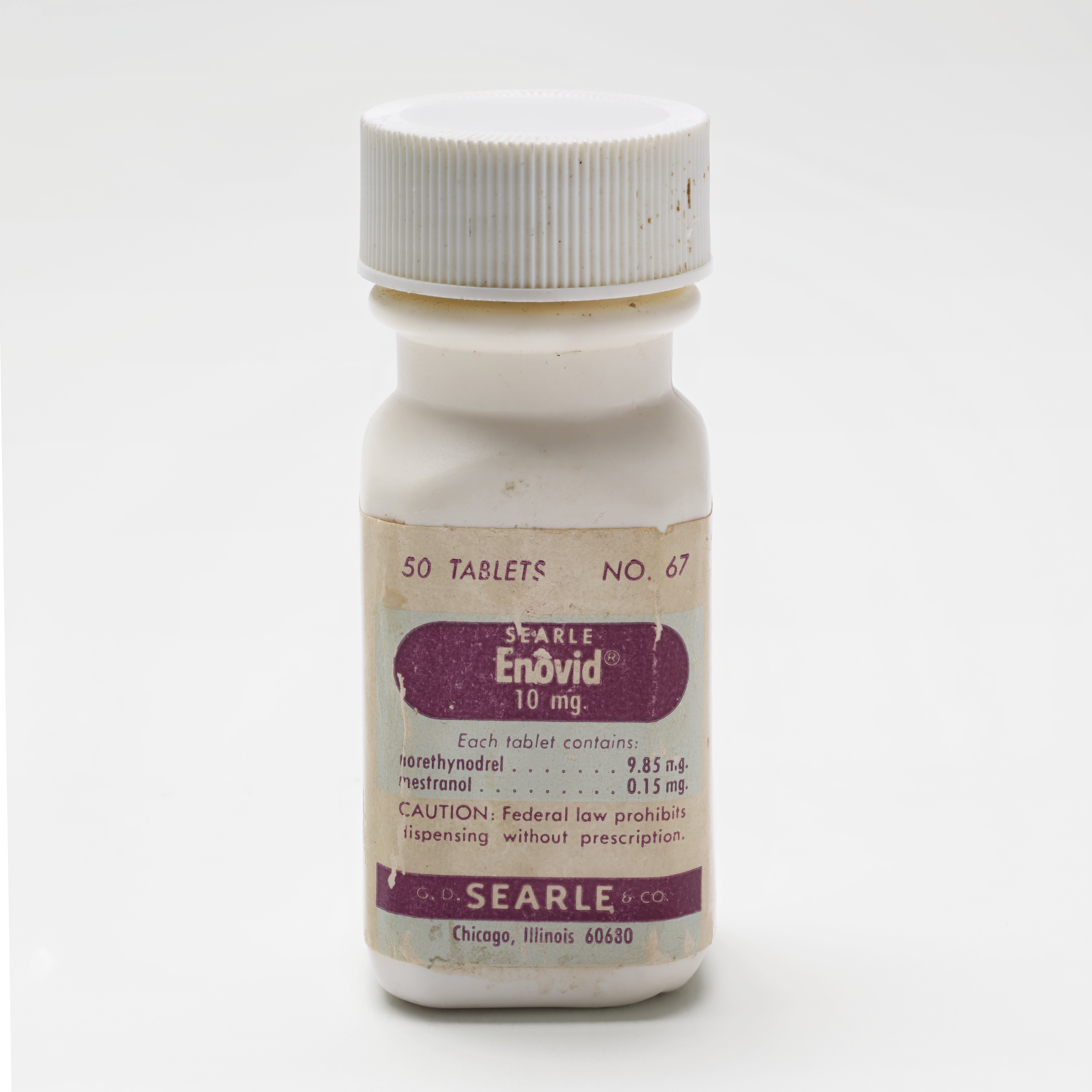
- A 10 mg bottle of Enovid, the first mestranol/noretynodrel medication

Combination of
- Mestranol: Estrogen
- Norethynodrel: Progestogen

Clinical data
- Trade names: Enavid, Enovid
- Routes of administration: By mouth
- ATC code: G03FA09 (WHO)

Legal status
- Legal status: Discontinued

Identifiers
- CAS Number: 8015-30-3
- PubChem CID: 66444
- CompTox Dashboard (EPA): DTXSID6020563

Mestranol/norethynodrel was the first combined oral contraceptive pill (COCP) being mestranol and norethynodrel. It sold as Enovid in the United States and as Enavid in the United Kingdom. Developed by Gregory Pincus at G. D. Searle & Company, it was first approved on June 10, 1957, by the U.S. Food and Drug Administration for treatment of menstrual disorders. The FDA approved an additional indication for use as a contraceptive on June 23, 1960, though it only became legally prescribable nationwide and regardless of the woman's marital status after Eisenstadt v. Baird in 1972. In 1961, it was approved as a contraceptive in the UK and in Canada.

== Medical uses ==
Mestranol/noretynodrel was indicated in the treatment of gynecological and menstrual disorders. Originally it was not legal to use contraception so it was marketed for menstrual relief with the side effect of inability to conceive. It has also been used to suppress lactation and to treat endometriosis in women.

=== Available forms ===
The medication contained 0.15 mg mestranol and 10 mg noretynodrel. Additional formulations containing 0.075 mg mestranol and 5 mg noretynodrel as well as 0.1 mg mestranol and 2.5 mg noretynodrel were subsequently introduced. One formulation also contained 0.075 mg mestranol and 3 mg noretynodrel.

== History ==
=== Creation ===
Enovid was first manufactured when scientists isolated progesterone from diosgenin, then removed 19-carbon from the molecule. This new form of progesterone had higher progestational activity, which prevented pregnancy.

=== Social impact ===
Initially sold in 1957, Enovid was first marketed as a treatment for gynecological disorders. In 1960, its sale as an oral contraceptive was approved by the FDA. This was seen as a major improvement to contraceptives as a whole, being preferred over other methods such as condoms and diaphragms.

=== Complications and legal proceedings ===
The first published case report of a blood clot and pulmonary embolism in a woman using Enavid (Enovid 10 mg in the U.S.) at a dose of 20 mg/day did not appear until November 1961, four years after its approval, by which time it had been used by over one million women. It would take almost a decade of epidemiological studies to conclusively establish an increased risk of venous thrombosis in oral contraceptive users and an increased risk of stroke and myocardial infarction in oral contraceptive users who smoke or have high blood pressure or other cardiovascular or cerebrovascular risk factors. These risks of oral contraceptives were dramatized in the 1969 book The Doctors' Case Against the Pill by feminist journalist Barbara Seaman who helped arrange the 1970 Nelson Pill Hearings called by Senator Gaylord Nelson. The hearings were conducted by senators who were all men and the witnesses in the first round of hearings were all men, leading Alice Wolfson and other feminists to protest the hearings and generate media attention. Their work led to mandating the inclusion of patient package inserts with oral contraceptives to explain their possible side effects and risks to help facilitate informed consent. Today's standard dose oral contraceptives contain an estrogen dose that is one third lower than the first marketed oral contraceptive and contain lower doses of different, more potent progestins in a variety of formulations.

Enovid was discontinued in the U.S. in 1988, along with other first-generation high-estrogen COCPs.

== See also ==
- Mestranol/norethisterone
- Birth control pill formulations
- List of combined sex-hormonal preparations
