= Worcester Foundation for Biomedical Research =

WBFR was a biomedical research institute in Shrewsbury, Massachusetts

Coordinates: 42.2867°N 71.7281°W

The Worcester Foundation for Biomedical Research (WFBR), known until 1995 as the Worcester Foundation for Experimental Biology (WFEB), was an independent, non-profit, biomedical research institute based in Shrewsbury, Massachusetts, United States, that operated from 1944 until it was absorbed into the University of Massachusetts Medical School (UMMS) in 1997. The Foundation was best known for the development and early testing of an effective and convenient oral contraceptive pill that could be taken daily by women — a transformative development in birth control, women's health, and medicine and society more broadly.

== History and research ==
The foundation was established in 1944 as an independent research center under the name Worcester Foundation for Experimental Biology (WFEB) by Hudson Hoagland and Gregory Pincus.

WFEB was best known for the development of the combined oral contraceptive pill by Pincus and Min Chueh Chang, an important development in women's health and safer birth control; and for pioneering research on in vitro fertilization by Chang.

In the 1970s, WFEB scientists undertook research into two important classes of drugs used to treat breast cancer. The first systematic study of anti-tumor effects of the anti-estrogen tamoxifen was led by V. Craig Jordan, who in 2003 was awarded the Kettering Prize, a prize for leading cancer research. Important initial studies of aromatase inhibitors were also conducted from 1971 onward by 2005 Kettering prize recipient Angela Brodie.

=== Summer Student Program ===
In the 1950s and 1960s, the WFEB sponsored a Pre-Collegiate Science Summer Program, similar to, but shorter-lived than, the Jackson Laboratory's Summer Student Program in Maine. Selected high school juniors and seniors spent several weeks living in the dormitories of nearby Saint Mark's School and doing advanced biochemical lab work under the guidance of St. Mark's teachers, Frederick R. Avis and Anna Pliscz. After studying the anatomy of mice in Avis' textbook, About Mice and Man, they performed surgery on them, using anesthesia and sterile techniques similar to those used in human surgery. They also transplanted tumors from one mouse to another, isolated 17-ketosteroids from their own urine, and did blood counts and manometric oxygen consumption measurements on bovine livers and kidneys maintained in a perfusion apparatus, among other experiments.

=== Name change and closure ===
In 1995, the foundation's name was changed to the Worcester Foundation for Biomedical Research to better reflect its increased focus on medical research. The institution ran into severe financial troubles and was taken over by the University of Massachusetts Medical School (UMMS) in 1997. The facility at 222 Maple Avenue, Shrewsbury, Massachusetts is currently operated by UMMS. The Hoagland-Pincus Conference Center at this site now hosts small scientific seminars, meetings, and retreats. The site is now home to the Center for Mindfulness in Medicine, Health Care, and Society, led by Dr. Jon Kabat-Zinn, at UMMS.
