= Hydroxyprogesterone caproate =

Chemical compound

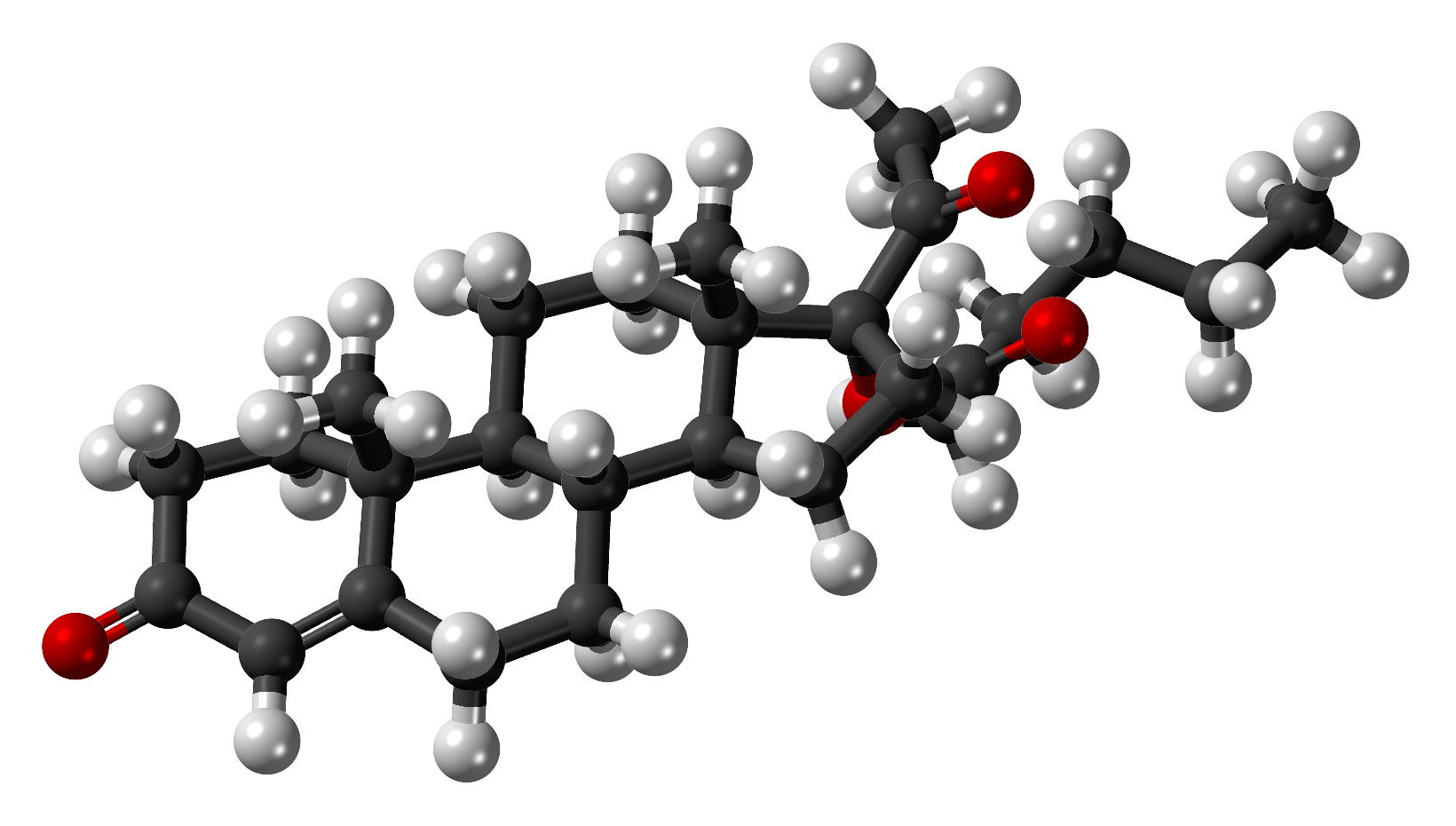

Clinical data
- Trade names: Delalutin, Proluton, Makena, others
- Other names: OHPC; Hydroxyprogesterone capronate; Hydroxyprogesterone hexanoate; 17α-Hydroxyprogesterone caproate; 17α-OHPC; 17-Hydroxyprogesterone caproate; 17-OHPC; 17-HPC; 17α-HPC; HPC; LPCN-1107; 17α-Hydroxypregn-4-ene-3,20-dione 17α-hexanoate
- Routes of administration: Intramuscular injection, subcutaneous autoinjection
- Drug class: Progestogen; Progestin; Progestogen ester; Antigonadotropin
- ATC code: G03DA03 (WHO) G03FA02 (WHO)

Legal status
- Legal status: US: withdrawn

Pharmacokinetic data
- Bioavailability: Oral: Very low (~3% in rats); Intramuscular: 100% (in rats)
- Protein binding: Extensive (to albumin, not to CBG or (likely) SHBG)
- Metabolism: Reduction and hydroxylation (via CYP3A4, CYP3A5, CYP3A7) and conjugation (glucuronidation, sulfation, acetylation)
- Elimination half-life: Non-pregnant: 7.8 days Singlet: 16–17 days Twins: 10 days
- Excretion: Feces: 50% Urine: 30%

Identifiers
- IUPAC name: [(8R,9S,10R,13S,14S,17R)-17-acetyl-10,13-dimethyl-3-oxo-2,6,7,8,9,11,12,14,15,16-decahydro-1H-cyclopenta[a]phenanthren-17-yl] hexanoate
- CAS Number: 630-56-8
- PubChem CID: 169870
- DrugBank: DB06789
- ChemSpider: 148552
- UNII: 276F2O42F5
- KEGG: D00949
- ChEBI: CHEBI:5812
- ChEMBL: ChEMBL1200848
- CompTox Dashboard (EPA): DTXSID6043915
- ECHA InfoCard: 100.010.127

Chemical and physical data
- Formula: C_{27}H_{40}O_{4}
- Molar mass: 428.613 g·mol^{−1}
- 3D model (JSmol): Interactive image
- SMILES: O=C4\C=C2/[C@]([C@H]1CC[C@@]3([C@@](OC(=O)CCCCC)(C(=O)C)CC[C@H]3[C@@H]1CC2)C)(C)CC4
- InChI: InChI=1S/C27H40O4/c1-5-6-7-8-24(30)31-27(18(2)28)16-13-23-21-10-9-19-17-20(29)11-14-25(19,3)22(21)12-15-26(23,27)4/h17,21-23H,5-16H2,1-4H3/t21-,22+,23+,25+,26+,27+/m1/s1; Key:DOMWKUIIPQCAJU-LJHIYBGHSA-N

Hydroxyprogesterone caproate, sold under the brand name Delalutin among others, is a medication used to reduce the risk of preterm birth in women pregnant with one baby who have a history of spontaneous preterm birth. In March 2023, the manufacturer, Covis Pharma, agreed to withdraw the drug from the US market. The approval of this drug substance was withdrawn by the US Food and Drug Administration (FDA) in April 2023. In May 2024, the Pharmacovigilance Risk Assessment Committee of the European Medicines Agency recommended suspending the marketing authorizations of medications containing 17-hydroxyprogesterone caproate in the European Union.

Hydroxyprogesterone caproate is a progestin medication which was used to prevent preterm birth in pregnant women with a history of the condition and to treat gynecological disorders. It has also been formulated in combination with estrogens for various indications (brand names Gravibinon and Primosiston) and as a form of long-lasting injectable birth control (brand name Chinese Injectable No. 1). It is not used by mouth and is instead given by injection into muscle or fat.

Hydroxyprogesterone caproate is generally well tolerated and produces few side effects. Injection site reactions such as pain and swelling are the most common side effect of hydroxyprogesterone caproate. The medication may increase the risk of gestational diabetes when used in pregnant women. Hydroxyprogesterone caproate is a progestin, or a synthetic progestogen, and hence is an agonist of the progesterone receptor, the biological target of progestogens like progesterone. It has some antimineralocorticoid activity and no other important hormonal activity. The medication shows a number of differences from natural progesterone.

Hydroxyprogesterone caproate was discovered in 1953 and was introduced for medical use in 1954 or 1955. It was marketed in the United States under the brand name Delalutin and throughout Europe under the brand name Proluton. The medication was discontinued in the United States in 1999. However, hydroxyprogesterone caproate was subsequently reintroduced in the United States under the brand name Makena for the treatment of preterm birth in 2011 until the FDA banned 17α-OHPC in 2023.

== Medical uses ==
=== Preterm birth ===
The use of hydroxyprogesterone caproate in pregnancy to prevent preterm birth in women with a history of preterm delivery between 20 weeks and 36 weeks and 6 days is supported by the Society of Maternal Fetal Medicine Clinic Guidelines put out in May 2012 as Level I and III evidence, Level A recommendation. Level I evidence refers to a properly powered randomized controlled trial, and level III evidence is support from expert opinion, while a Level A recommendation confers that the recommendation is made based on good and consistent scientific evidence. Hydroxyprogesterone caproate 250 mg IM weekly preferably starting at 16–20 weeks until 36 weeks is recommended. In these women, if the transvaginal ultrasound cervical length shortens to <25 mm at < 24 weeks, cervical cerclage may be offered. In the 2013 study the guideline recommendation is based on, there was also a significant decrease of neonatal morbidity including lower rates of necrotizing enterocolitis (0 in the treatment group vs 4 in the control), intraventricular hemorrhage (4 in the treatment group compared with 8 in the control for a relative risk of 0.25), and need for supplemental oxygen (14% in the treatment group vs 24% in the placebo for a relative risk of 0.42). Furthermore, this study contained 463 women, 310 of whom received injection. Of these women, 9 had infants with congenital malformations (2%), but there was no consistent pattern and none involved internal organs.

There is no evidence of fetal risk with use of hydroxyprogesterone caproate during pregnancy. A review concluded that information about the potential harms was lacking. Three clinical studies in singleton pregnancies of 250 mg/week of intramuscular hydroxyprogesterone caproate have all shown a trend for an increase in pregnancy loss due to miscarriage compared to placebo. One of them, a large National Institutes of Health (NIH) study in 2003, looked at the effect of hydroxyprogesterone caproate injections in women at risk for repeat premature birth and found that the treated group experienced premature birth in 37% versus 55% in the controls. A follow-up study of the offspring showed no evidence that hydroxyprogesterone caproate affected the children in the first years of life. Based on these NIH data, hydroxyprogesterone caproate was approved by the US Food and Drug Administration (FDA) in 2011, as a medication to reduce the risk of premature birth in selected women at risk.

The FDA expressed concern about miscarriage at the 2006 advisory committee meeting; the committee voted unanimously that further study was needed to evaluate the potential association of hydroxyprogesterone caproate with increased risk of second trimester miscarriage and stillbirth. A toxicology study in rhesus monkeys resulted in the death of all rhesus fetuses exposed to 1 and 10 times the human dose equivalent of hydroxyprogesterone caproate. As of 2008, hydroxyprogesterone caproate was a category D progestin according to the FDA (that is, there is evidence of fetal harm). There is speculation that the castor oil in the hydroxyprogesterone caproate formulation may not be beneficial for pregnancy. Of note, the above-mentioned NEJM study by Meirs et al. compares the effect of hydroxyprogesterone caproate (with the castor oil component) to castor oil injection as the placebo.

A study published in February 2016, found amongst other findings:

OPPTIMUM strongly suggests that the efficacy of progesterone in improving outcomes is either non-existent or weak. Given the heterogeneity of the preterm labour syndrome we cannot exclude benefit in specific phenotypic or genotypic subgroups of women at risk. However, the subgroups of women who might benefit do not appear to be easily identifiable by current selection strategies, including cervical length measurement and fibronectin testing. Reassuringly, our study suggests that progesterone is safe for those who wish to take it for preterm birth prophylaxis. The overall rate of maternal or child adverse events was similar in the progesterone and placebo groups. There were few differences in the incidence of adverse secondary outcomes in the two groups, with the exception of a higher rate of renal, gastrointestinal, and respiratory complications in childhood in the progesterone groups. Importantly, the absolute rates of these complications was low. Follow-up of other babies exposed in utero to vaginal progesterone would be helpful in determining whether the increased rate of some renal, gastrointestinal, and respiratory complications is a real effect or a type I error.

The journal reviewer made the following notable commentary on the OPPTIMUM study: "That's it. This story is ended, and nobody need ever use vaginal progesterone again to prevent preterm birth."

A Cochrane review on progestogen for preventing preterm birth concluded that there was little evidence that either vaginal or intramuscular progesterone helped to reduce the risk of preterm birth in women with a multiple pregnancy.

=== Gynecological disorders ===
Hydroxyprogesterone caproate is used in the treatment of threatened miscarriage, gynecological disorders such as dysmenorrhea, premenstrual syndrome, fibrocystic breast disease, adenosis, and breast pain. In addition, hydroxyprogesterone caproate is used in the treatment of endometrial cancer and has been found to be significantly effective in extending life in both premenopausal and postmenopausal women with the disease. The medication was used widely in the 1950s through the 1970s for such indications, but hydroxyprogesterone caproate more recently has received the most attention in the prevention of preterm birth.

=== Birth control ===
Hydroxyprogesterone caproate is available in combination with estradiol valerate as a once-monthly combined injectable contraceptive in some countries.

=== Other uses ===
Hydroxyprogesterone caproate has been used as a component of menopausal hormone therapy in women.

Hydroxyprogesterone caproate has been used to treat benign prostatic hyperplasia in men, although evidence of effectiveness is marginal and uncertain. It has also been used to treat prostate cancer, at a dosage of 1,500 mg twice per week. The mechanism of action of hydroxyprogesterone caproate in these uses is suppression of testicular androgen production via suppression of luteinizing hormone secretion, which are the result of the progestogenic and antigonadotropic activity of hydroxyprogesterone caproate. However, symptoms of hypogonadism may develop when hydroxyprogesterone caproate is used for this indication, with two-thirds of men reportedly experiencing impotence.

Hydroxyprogesterone caproate has been used as a component of feminizing hormone therapy for transgender women. Due to micronization, bioidentical progestogens are more commonly used.

=== Available forms ===
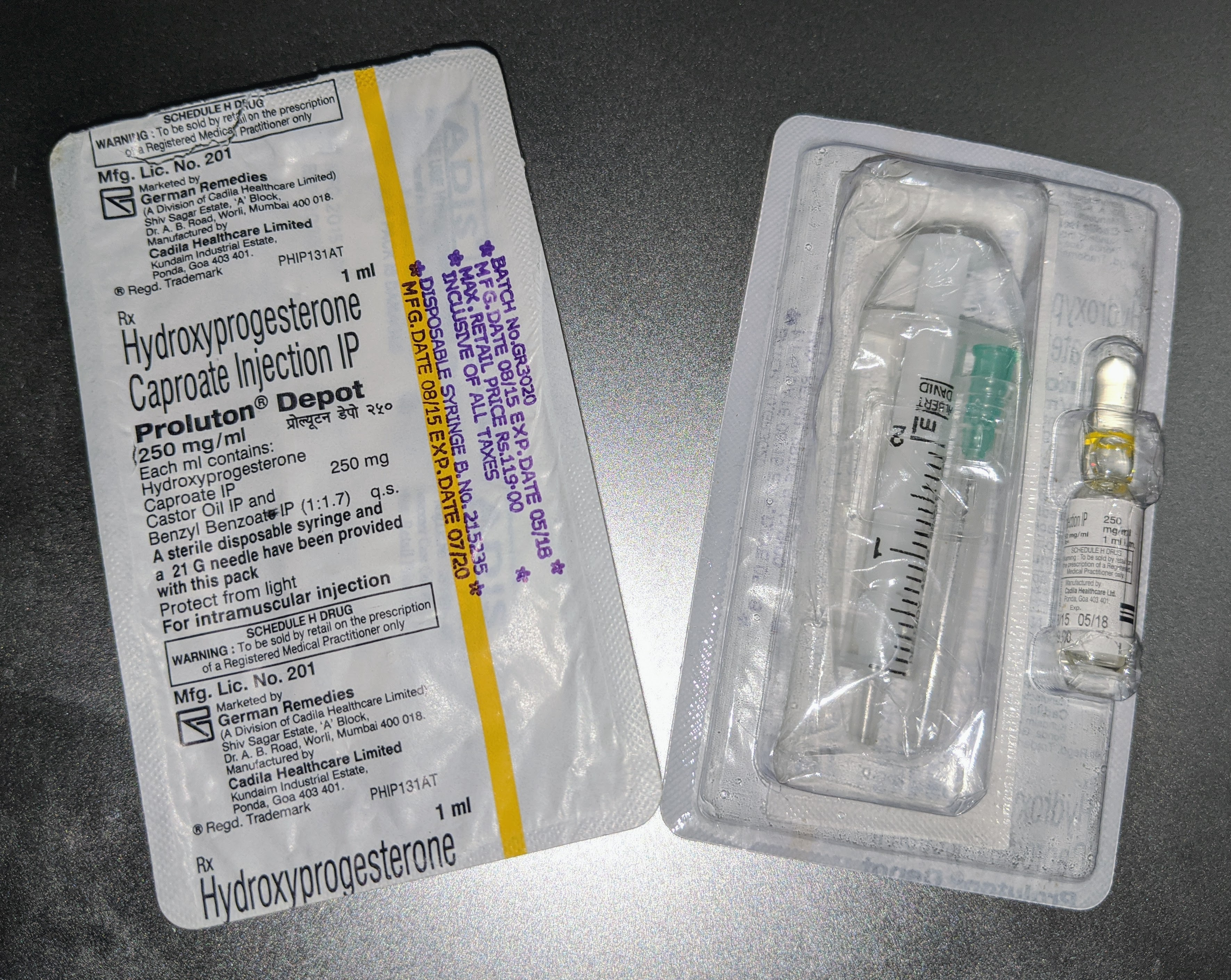
Single-use packs of Proluton Depot (OHPC). Contain 1-mL ampoules of 250 mg/mL hydroxyprogesterone caproate (250 mg total) in castor oil and benzyl benzoate solution as well as a 21 G needles and disposable syringes and indicated for use by intramuscular injection.

Hydroxyprogesterone caproate is available alone in the form of ampoules and vials of 125 and 250 mg/mL oil solutions for intramuscular injection (brand names Proluton, Makena). It is also available alone in the form of a 250 mg/mL autoinjector for use by subcutaneous injection (brand name Makena).

Hydroxyprogesterone caproate is or was available in combination with estradiol valerate in the form of ampoules and vials of 250 mg/mL OHPC and 5 mg/mL estradiol valerate oil solutions for intramuscular injection (brand names Gravibinon, Chinese Injectable No. 1). The medication is or was available in combination with estradiol benzoate in the form of ampoules of 125–250 mg OHPC and 10 mg estradiol benzoate in oil solution for intramuscular injection (brand name Primosiston) as well. In addition, hydroxyprogesterone caproate has been marketed in combination with estradiol dipropionate in the form of 50 mg/mL hydroxyprogesterone caproate and 1 mg/mL estradiol dipropionate (brand name EP Hormone Depot) in Japan.

== Contraindications ==
Contraindications of hydroxyprogesterone caproate include previous or current thrombosis or thromboembolic disease, known or suspected breast cancer, past or present history of other hormone-sensitive cancer, undiagnosed abnormal vaginal bleeding unrelated to pregnancy, cholestatic jaundice of pregnancy, liver tumors or active liver disease, and uncontrolled hypertension. A few relative contraindications also exist for hydroxyprogesterone caproate.

== Side effects ==
Hydroxyprogesterone caproate is generally well tolerated and produces relatively few side effects. Injection site reactions such as pain, soreness, swelling, itching, bruising, and lumps are the most common side effect of hydroxyprogesterone caproate. In contrast to large doses of progesterone however, which produce moderate-to-severe such reactions, hydroxyprogesterone caproate is relatively free from injection site reactions. Side effects of hydroxyprogesterone caproate that occur in greater than or equal to 2% of users include injection site pain (34.8%), injection site swelling (17.1%), urticaria (12.3%), pruritus (7.7%), injection site pruritus (5.8%), nausea (5.8%), injection site nodules (4.5%), and diarrhea (2.3%). Numerically increased rates relative to controls of miscarriage (2.4% vs. 0%), stillbirth (2.0% vs. 1.3%), admission for preterm labor (16.0% vs. 13.8%), preeclampsia or gestational hypertension (8.8% vs. 4.6%), gestational diabetes (5.6% vs. 4.6%), and oligohydramnios (3.6% vs. 1.3%) have been observed with hydroxyprogesterone caproate in clinical trials in which it was given to pregnant women to prevent preterm birth.

== Overdose ==
There have been no reports of overdose of hydroxyprogesterone caproate. In the event of overdose, treatment should be based on symptoms. Hydroxyprogesterone caproate has been studied in humans at high doses of 2,000 to 5,000 mg per week by intramuscular injection, without safety concerns.

== Interactions ==
Hydroxyprogesterone caproate is not likely to affect most cytochrome P450 enzymes at therapeutic concentrations. Drug interaction studies have not been performed with hydroxyprogesterone caproate.

== Pharmacology ==
=== Pharmacodynamics ===
Hydroxyprogesterone caproate has progestogenic activity, some antimineralocorticoid activity, and no other important hormonal activity.

Relative affinities (%) of hydroxyprogesterone and related steroids
Compound	hPR-A	hPR-B	rbPR	rbGR	rbER
Progesterone	100	100	100	<1	<1
17α-Hydroxyprogesterone	1	1	3	1	<1
Hydroxyprogesterone caproate	26	30	28	4	<1
Hydroxyprogesterone acetate	38	46	115	3	?
Notes: Values are percentages (%). Reference ligands (100%) were progesterone for the PR, dexamethasone for the GR, and estradiol for the ER. Sources: See template.

Parenteral potencies and durations of progestogens (Note: Sources:) (Note: All given by intramuscular or subcutaneous injection.)
Compound	Form	Dose for specific uses (mg) (Note: Progesterone production during the luteal phase is ~25 (15–50) mg/day. The OID of OHPC is 250 to 500 mg/month.)			DOA (Note: Duration of action in days.)
Compound	Form	TFD (Note: Usually given for 14 days.)	POICD (Note: Usually dosed every two to three months.)	CICD (Note: Usually dosed once monthly.)	DOA
Algestone acetophenide	Oil soln.	–	–	75–150	14–32 d
Gestonorone caproate	Oil soln.	25–50	–	–	8–13 d
Hydroxyprogest. acetate (Note: Never marketed or approved by this route.)	Aq. susp.	350	–	–	9–16 d
Hydroxyprogest. caproate	Oil soln.	250–500 (Note: In divided doses (2 × 125 or 250 mg for OHPC, 10 × 20 mg for P4).)	–	250–500	5–21 d
Medroxyprog. acetate	Aq. susp.	50–100	150	25	14–50+ d
Megestrol acetate	Aq. susp.	–	–	25	>14 d
Norethisterone enanthate	Oil soln.	100–200	200	50	11–52 d
Progesterone	Oil soln.	200	–	–	2–6 d
Progesterone	Aq. soln.	?	–	–	1–2 d
Progesterone	Aq. susp.	50–200	–	–	7–14 d
Notes and sources:

==== Progestogenic activity ====
Hydroxyprogesterone caproate, also known as 17α-hydroxyprogesterone caproate, is closer to progesterone in terms of structure and pharmacology than most other progestins, and is essentially a pure progestogen – that is, a selective agonist of the progesterone receptor (PR) with minimal or no other hormonal activity. However, hydroxyprogesterone caproate has improved pharmacokinetics compared to progesterone, namely a much longer duration with intramuscular injection in oil solution.

Administered by intramuscular injection, the endometrial transformation dosage of hydroxyprogesterone caproate per cycle is 250 to 500 mg, and the weekly substitution dosage of hydroxyprogesterone caproate is 250 mg, while the effective dosage of hydroxyprogesterone caproate in the menstrual delay test (Greenblatt) is 25 mg per week. An effective ovulation-inhibiting dosage of hydroxyprogesterone caproate is 500 mg once per month by intramuscular injection. However, the dose of hydroxyprogesterone caproate used in once-a-month combined injectable contraceptives is 250 mg, and this combination is effective for inhibition of ovulation similarly. For comparison, the dose of medroxyprogesterone acetate (MPA; 6α-methyl-17α-hydroxyprogesterone acetate), a close analogue of hydroxyprogesterone caproate, used by intramuscular injection in microcrystalline aqueous suspension in once-a-month combined injectable contraceptives, is 25 mg. It has also been said that given by intramuscular injection, 250 mg hydroxyprogesterone caproate in oil solution is equivalent in progestogenic potency to 50 mg medroxyprogesterone acetate in microcrystalline aqueous suspension. Although the elimination half-life of intramuscular hydroxyprogesterone caproate in oil solution in non-pregnant women is about 8 days, the elimination half-life of intramuscular medroxyprogesterone acetate in microcrystalline aqueous suspension in women is around 50 days. Hydroxyprogesterone caproate is also to some degree less potent than the more closely related ester hydroxyprogesterone acetate (OHPA; 17α-hydroxyprogesterone acetate).

17α-Hydroxyprogesterone (OHP) has weak progestogenic activity, but C17α esterification results in higher progestogenic activity. Of a variety of different esters, the caproate (hexanoate) ester was found to have the strongest progestogenic activity, and this served as the basis for the development of hydroxyprogesterone caproate, as well as other caproate progestogen esters such as gestonorone caproate. Hydroxyprogesterone caproate is a much more potent progestogen than 17α-hydroxyprogesterone, but does not have as high of affinity for the PR as progesterone. Hydroxyprogesterone caproate has about 26% and 30% of the affinity of progesterone for the human PR-A and PR-B, respectively. The medication was no more efficacious than progesterone in activating these receptors and eliciting associated gene expression in vitro.

==== Antigonadotropic effects ====
Due to activation of the PR, hydroxyprogesterone caproate has antigonadotropic effects, or produces suppression of the hypothalamic–pituitary–gonadal axis, and can significantly suppress gonadotropin secretion and gonadal sex hormone production at sufficiently high doses. One study found that hydroxyprogesterone caproate by intramuscular injection at a dosage of 200 mg twice weekly for the first two weeks and then 200 mg once weekly for 12 weeks did not significantly influence urinary excretion of estrogens, luteinizing hormone, or follicle-stimulating hormone in men with benign prostatic hyperplasia. In another study that used an unspecified dosage of intramuscular hydroxyprogesterone caproate, testosterone secretion was assessed in a single man and was found to decrease from 4.2 mg/day to 2.0 mg/day (or by approximately 52%) by 6 weeks of treatment, whereas secretion of luteinizing hormone remained unchanged in the man. Yet another study found that 3,000 mg/week hydroxyprogesterone caproate by intramuscular injection suppressed testosterone levels from 640 ng/dL to 320–370 ng/dL (by 42–50%) in a single man with prostate cancer, which was similar to the testosterone suppression with cyproterone acetate or chlormadinone acetate. Gestonorone caproate, a closely related progestin to hydroxyprogesterone caproate with about 5- to 10-fold greater potency in humans, was found to suppress testosterone levels by 75% at a dosage of 400 mg/week in men with prostate cancer. For comparison, orchiectomy decreased testosterone levels by 91%. In general, progestins are able to maximally suppress testosterone levels by about 70 to 80%. The antigonadotropic effects of hydroxyprogesterone caproate and hence its testosterone suppression are the basis of the use of hydroxyprogesterone caproate in the treatment of benign prostatic hyperplasia and prostate cancer in men. Suppression of luteinizing hormone levels by hydroxyprogesterone caproate has also been observed in women.

==== Glucocorticoid activity ====
Hydroxyprogesterone caproate is said not to have any glucocorticoid activity. In accordance, hydroxyprogesterone caproate has been found not to alter cortisol levels in humans even with very high doses by intramuscular injection. This is of relevance because medications with significant glucocorticoid activity suppress cortisol levels due to increased negative feedback on the hypothalamic–pituitary–adrenal axis. Hydroxyprogesterone caproate has been studied in humans at doses as high as 5,000 mg per week by intramuscular injection, with safety and without glucocorticoid effects observed. The medication does interact with the glucocorticoid receptor however; it has about 4% of the affinity of dexamethasone for the rabbit glucocorticoid receptor. But it acts as a partial agonist of the receptor and has no greater efficacy than progesterone in activating the receptor and eliciting associated gene expression in vitro.

==== Other activities ====
As a pure progestogen, hydroxyprogesterone caproate has no androgenic, antiandrogenic, estrogenic, or glucocorticoid activity. The absence of androgenic and antiandrogenic activity with hydroxyprogesterone caproate is in contrast to most other 17α-hydroxyprogesterone-derivative progestins. Due to its lack of androgenic properties, similarly to progesterone, hydroxyprogesterone caproate does not have any teratogenic effects on the fetus, making it safe for use during pregnancy. Although hydroxyprogesterone caproate has been described as a pure progestogen, there is evidence that it possesses some antimineralocorticoid activity, similarly to progesterone and 17α-hydroxyprogesterone. This includes clinically important diuretic effects and reversal of estrogen-induced fluid retention and edema. Unlike progesterone, hydroxyprogesterone caproate and its metabolites are not anticipated to interact with non-genomic receptors such as membrane progesterone receptors or the GABA_{A} receptor. In accordance, hydroxyprogesterone caproate is not thought to possess the neurosteroid activities of progesterone or its associated sedative effects.

In relation to cytochrome P450 enzymes, hydroxyprogesterone caproate has no effect on CYP1A, CYP2D6, CYP2C9, or CYP3A4, but is a modest inducer of CYP2C19.

==== Differences from progesterone ====
There are pharmacodynamic differences between progesterone and hydroxyprogesterone caproate, which may have implications for obstetrical use. These include:

- Decreased myometrial activity with progesterone in vitro but no effect or increased myometrial activity with hydroxyprogesterone caproate
- Prevention of cervical ripening with progesterone but unknown effect with hydroxyprogesterone caproate
- A non-significantly increased rate of stillbirth and miscarriages with hydroxyprogesterone caproate (in one study)
- A possibly increased incidence of gestational diabetes with hydroxyprogesterone caproate (increased in two studies, no difference in one study) but no such effect with progesterone
- A significantly increased risk of perinatal adverse effects such as fetal loss and preterm delivery in multiple gestations with hydroxyprogesterone caproate (in two studies)

Differences in the metabolism of progesterone and hydroxyprogesterone caproate and differences in the formation and activities of metabolites may be responsible for or involved in these observed biological and pharmacological differences. Progesterone is metabolized by 5α- and 5β-reductases, 3α- and 3β-hydroxysteroid dehydrogenases, and 20α- and 20β-hydroxysteroid dehydrogenase in various tissues. In target tissues, particularly the cervix and myometrium, these enzymes regulate local progesterone concentrations and can activate or inactivate progesterone signaling. In addition, these enzymes catalyze the formation of metabolites of progesterone such as 5β-dihydroprogesterone and allopregnanolone, which signal through their own non-genomic receptors such as membrane progesterone receptors and the GABA_{A} receptor and have their own important effects in pregnancy. As examples, 5β-dihydroprogesterone has been found to play an important role in suppressing myometrial activity while allopregnanolone has potent sedative and anesthetic effects in the mother and especially the fetus and is involved in fetal nervous system development. In contrast to progesterone, hydroxyprogesterone caproate is not metabolized by traditional steroid-transforming enzymes and instead is metabolized exclusively via oxidation at the caproate side chain by cytochrome P450 enzymes. As such, it is not thought to have the same tissue-specific activation and inactivation patterns that progesterone does nor the same non-genomic actions that progesterone and its metabolites possess.

Further clinical research is anticipated to provide additional data to help clarify the issue of safety with hydroxyprogesterone caproate. In any case, it has been recommended by the American College of Obstetricians and Gynecologists that pregnant women treated with hydroxyprogesterone caproate receive counseling about its risks and benefits.

=== Pharmacokinetics ===
Pharmacokinetics of OHPC^{a} in pregnant women
Parameter	Singleton	Twin
C_{max} (ng/mL)	22.6 (15.8–27.4)	17.3 (12–27)
C_{mean(0–t)} (ng/mL)	16.8 (12.8–22.7)	12.3 (8.4–18.7)
C_{trough} (ng/mL)	14.1 (10–18.1)	11.2 (4.8–16.3)
AUC_{0–t} (ng/mL/day)	117.3 (89.9–159.1)	86.1 (59–131)
t_{1/2} (days)	16.2 (10.6–21.0)	10 (6–16)
T_{max} (days)	1.0 (1–3)	1.2 (1–2)
V_{d}/F (×10^{3}) (L)	56 (25.2–69.6)	16.9 (9.1–24.5)
Cl/F (×10^{3}) (L)	2.1 (1.5–2.7)	1.2 (0.9–1.7)
Footnotes: ^{a} = OHPC 250 mg once per week by intramuscular injection. Sources:

==== Absorption ====
In animals, the bioavailability of hydroxyprogesterone caproate with intramuscular injection is nearly 100%, but its oral bioavailability is very low at less than 3%. In women, 70 mg/day oral hydroxyprogesterone caproate has similar endometrial potency as 70 mg/day oral OHPA and 2.5 mg/day oral medroxyprogesterone acetate, indicating that oral hydroxyprogesterone caproate and OHPA have almost 30-fold lower potency than medroxyprogesterone acetate via oral administration. Studies on progestogenic endometrial changes with oral hydroxyprogesterone caproate in women are mixed however, with one finding weak effects with 100 mg/day whereas another found that doses of 250 to 1,000 mg produced no effects. As a result of its low oral potency, hydroxyprogesterone caproate has not been used by the oral route and has instead been administered by intramuscular injection. However, a novel oral formulation of hydroxyprogesterone caproate (developmental code name LPCN-1107) is under development and has been found to be effective, though it required administration twice a day in a clinical study.

A depot effect occurs when hydroxyprogesterone caproate is injected intramuscularly or subcutaneously, such that the medication has a prolonged duration of action. Following a single intramuscular injection of 1,000 mg hydroxyprogesterone caproate in five women with endometrial cancer, peak levels of hydroxyprogesterone caproate were 27.8 ± 5.3 ng/mL and the time to peak concentrations was 4.6 ± 1.7 (3–7) days. Following 13 weeks of continuous administration of 1,000 mg hydroxyprogesterone caproate per week, trough levels of hydroxyprogesterone caproate were 60.0 ± 14 ng/mL. The pharmacokinetic parameters of 250 mg hydroxyprogesterone caproate once per week by intramuscular injection have also been studied in pregnant women with singleton and multiple (twin and triplet) gestation. Steady state levels of the medication are achieved within 4 to 12 weeks of administration in pregnant women. The duration of clinical biological effect of hydroxyprogesterone caproate by intramuscular injection has also been studied in women. A single intramuscular injection of 65 to 500 mg hydroxyprogesterone caproate in oil solution has been found to have a duration of action of 5 to 21 days in terms of effect in the uterus and on body temperature in women.

Hydroxyprogesterone caproate has been found to possess similar pharmacokinetics, including peak levels, time to peak levels, area-under-the-curve levels (i.e., total exposure), and elimination half-life, with administration via intramuscular injection or subcutaneous autoinjection. However, there was a higher incidence of injection site pain with subcutaneous autoinjection than with intramuscular injection (37.3% vs. 8.2%).

==== Distribution ====
Hydroxyprogesterone caproate is extensively bound to plasma proteins, of which include albumin. Unlike progesterone and 17α-hydroxyprogesterone, hydroxyprogesterone caproate has very low affinity for corticosteroid-binding globulin (less than 0.01% of that of cortisol). Progesterone and 17α-hydroxyprogesterone have low affinity for sex hormone-binding globulin, and for this reason, only a very small fraction of them (less than 0.5%) is bound to this protein in the circulation.

==== Metabolism ====
Hydroxyprogesterone caproate appears to be metabolized primarily by the cytochrome P450 enzymes CYP3A4 and CYP3A5. It may also be metabolized by CYP3A7 in fetal liver and the placenta. Unlike progesterone, hydroxyprogesterone caproate is not metabolized by traditional steroid-transforming enzymes and does not form similar metabolites. The metabolism of hydroxyprogesterone caproate is by reduction, hydroxylation, and conjugation, including glucuronidation, sulfation, and acetylation. The caproate ester of hydroxyprogesterone caproate is not cleaved during metabolism, so 17α-hydroxyprogesterone is not formed from hydroxyprogesterone caproate. As such, hydroxyprogesterone caproate is not a prodrug of 17α-hydroxyprogesterone, nor of progesterone.

Hydroxyprogesterone caproate has been found to have an elimination half-life of 7.8 days when given by intramuscular injection in an oil-based formulation to non-pregnant women. Its total duration is said to be 10 to 14 days, which is much longer than the duration of intramuscularly administered progesterone in an oil formulation (2 to 3 days). In pregnant women, the elimination half-life of hydroxyprogesterone caproate appears to be longer, about 16 or 17 days. However, in women pregnant with twins rather than a singlet, the elimination half-life of hydroxyprogesterone caproate was found to be shorter than this, at 10 days. Hydroxyprogesterone caproate has been detected in pregnant women up to 44 days after the last dose.

==== Elimination ====
Hydroxyprogesterone caproate is eliminated 50% in feces and 30% in urine when given by intramuscular injection to pregnant women. Both the free steroid and conjugates are excreted by these routes, with the conjugates more prominent in feces.

==== Time–concentration curves ====
Hormone levels with hydroxyprogesterone caproate
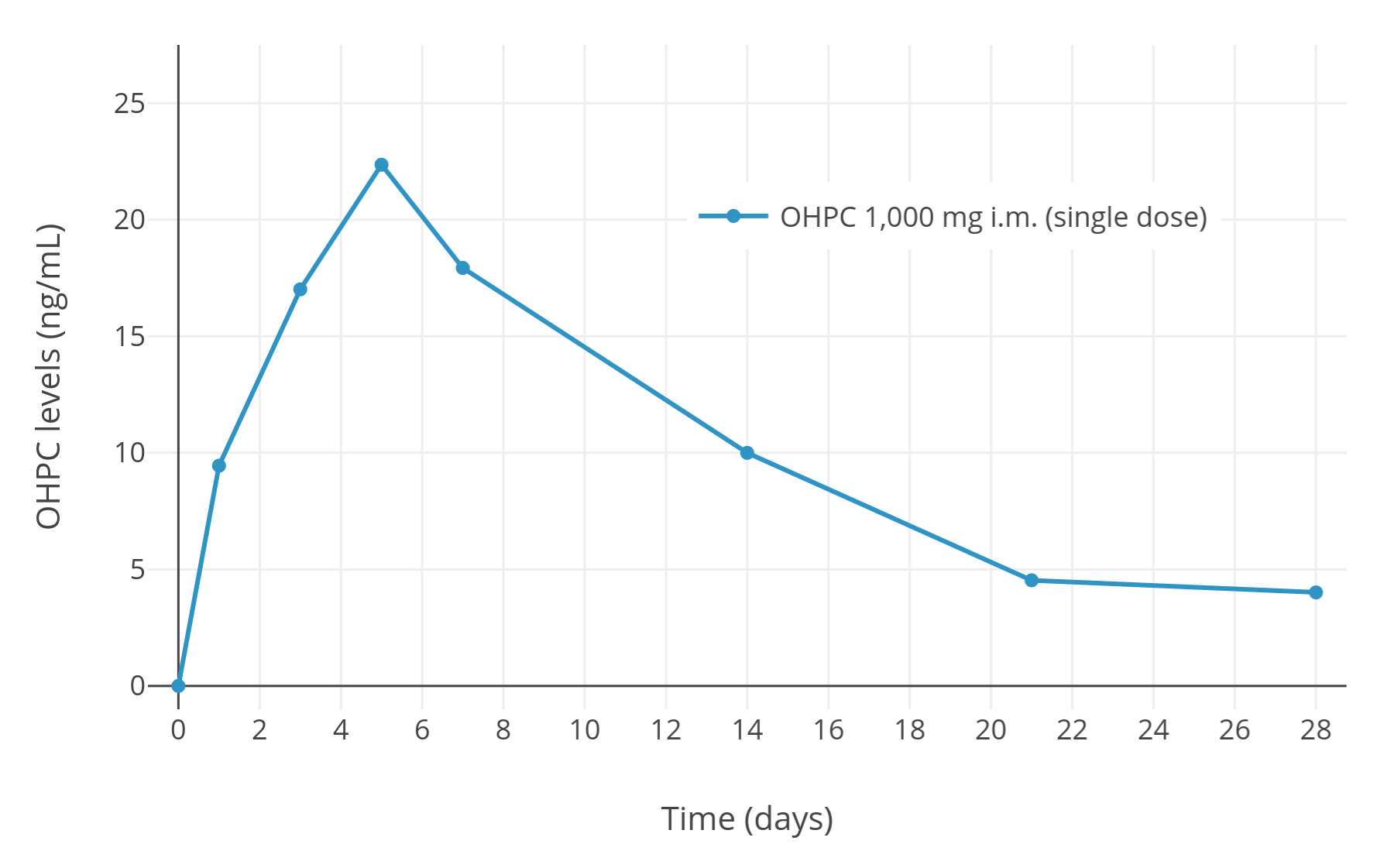
OHPC levels after a single intramuscular injection of 1,000 mg OHPC in five women with endometrial cancer.

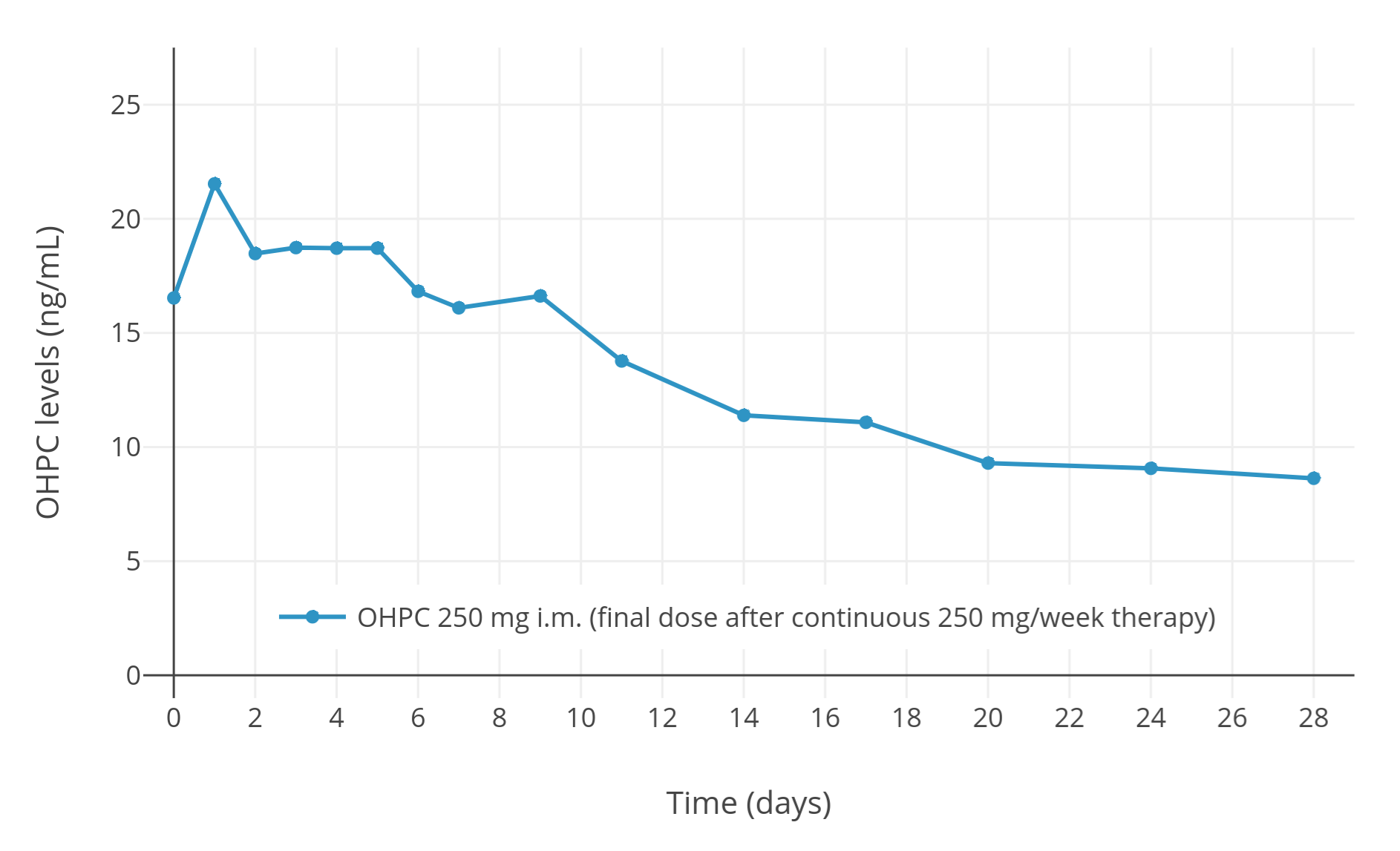
OHPC levels over the course of a month after a final dose following continuous therapy with 250 mg per week OHPC by intramuscular injection in pregnant women with singleton gestation.

== Chemistry ==
Hydroxyprogesterone caproate, also known as 17α-hydroxyprogesterone caproate or as 17α-hydroxypregn-4-ene-3,20-dione 17α-hexanoate, is a synthetic pregnane steroid and a derivative of progesterone. It is specifically a derivative of 17α-hydroxyprogesterone with a hexanoate (caproate) ester at the C17α position. Analogues of hydroxyprogesterone caproate include other 17α-hydroxyprogesterone derivatives such as algestone acetophenide (dihydroxyprogesterone acetophenide), chlormadinone acetate, cyproterone acetate, hydroxyprogesterone acetate, hydroxyprogesterone heptanoate, medroxyprogesterone acetate, and megestrol acetate, as well as the caproate esters chlormadinone caproate, gestonorone caproate (norhydroxyprogesterone caproate), medroxyprogesterone caproate, megestrol caproate, and methenmadinone caproate.

=== Synthesis ===
Chemical syntheses of hydroxyprogesterone caproate have been described.

== History ==
Along with hydroxyprogesterone acetate, hydroxyprogesterone caproate was developed by Karl Junkmann of Schering AG in 1953 and was first reported by him in the medical literature in 1954. It was reportedly first marketed in Japan in 1954 or 1955, and was subsequently introduced as Delalutin in the United States in 1956. Due to its much longer duration than parenteral progesterone, hydroxyprogesterone caproate had largely replaced progesterone in clinical practice by 1975. After decades of use, Squibb, the manufacturer, voluntarily withdrew the Delalutin product in the United States in 1999. Renewed interest in hydroxyprogesterone caproate in the United States was sparked with a large NIH-sponsored study in 2003 that found that hydroxyprogesterone caproate reduced the risk of premature birth in selected at-risk pregnant women. With follow-up data showing no evidence of harmful effects on the offspring, the FDA approved the medication Makena, sponsored by KV Pharmaceutical, as an orphan drug in February 2011 to reduce the risk of premature birth in women prior to 37 weeks gestation with a single fetus who had at least one previous premature birth.

Under the FDA Accelerated Approval Programs, drugs that fill an unmet need for serious conditions can be approved based on a surrogate endpoint. The pharmaceutical company is required to conduct confirmatory studies to show the drug provides a clinical benefit. The confirmatory trial, the PROLONG study, was completed in 2019 and showed no benefit in preventing preterm birth. The FDA proposed withdrawal of approval for Makena in 2020.

== Society and culture ==
=== Names ===
Hydroxyprogesterone caproate is the generic name of OHPC and its INN, USAN, BANM, and JAN, while hydroxyprogesterone hexanoate was its former BANM.

Hydroxyprogesterone caproate is often mislabeled as and confused with progesterone and 17α-hydroxyprogesterone. It should also not be confused with hydroxyprogesterone acetate, hydroxyprogesterone heptanoate, or medroxyprogesterone acetate.

Hydroxyprogesterone caproate is marketed throughout the world under a variety of brand names including Proluton, Proluton Depot, and Makena, among many others. It was also formerly marketed under brand names including Delalutin, Prodrox, and Hylutin among others, but these formulations have been discontinued. It has been marketed under the brand names Gravibinon and Injectable No. 1 (or Chinese Injectable No. 1) in combination with estradiol valerate and under the brand name Primosiston in combination with estradiol benzoate.

=== Availability ===
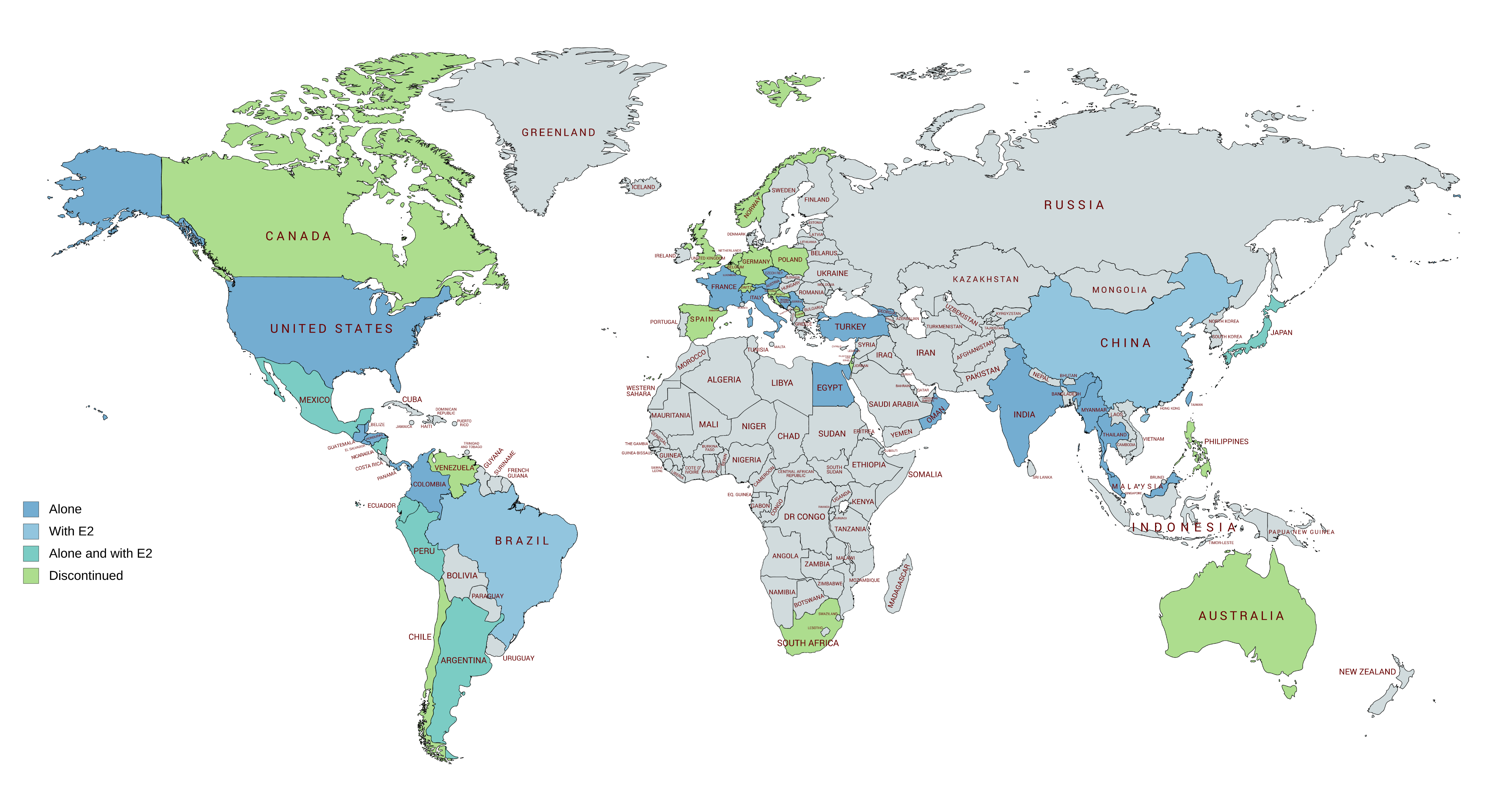
Known availability of hydroxyprogesterone caproate in countries throughout the world (as of August 2018). Alone is hydroxyprogesterone caproate as a standalone medication. With E2 is in combination with an estradiol ester. Discontinued is no longer available.

Hydroxyprogesterone caproate is marketed in the United States and throughout Europe, Asia, and Central and South America. It is not available in Canada, the United Kingdom, New Zealand, or South Africa, and only veterinary formulations are available in Australia. Hydroxyprogesterone caproate is also marketed in combination with estradiol valerate as a combined injectable contraceptive in a number of countries including in South America, Mexico, Japan, and China. It has been marketed as an injectable preparation in combination with estradiol benzoate in some countries as well.

=== Economics ===
With the designation of hydroxyprogesterone caproate as an orphan drug by the FDA and approval of Makena in 2011, the price of hydroxyprogesterone caproate in the United States was going to increase from US$15 to US$1,500 for a single dose, or from about US$300 to between US$25,000 and US$30,000 for a typical single month of treatment. This was about a 100-fold increase in cost, with "minimal added clinical benefit", and was a strongly criticized pricing strategy. The FDA subsequently announced that compounding pharmacies could continue to sell hydroxyprogesterone caproate at their usual cost of approximately US$10 to US$20 per dose without fear of enforcement action by the agency. KV Pharmaceutical also opted to reduced its price of Makena to US$690 per dose. Hydroxyprogesterone caproate continued to be available at low cost from compounding pharmacies until late 2016, after which time the FDA published new guidance documents prohibiting compounding pharmacies from selling products that are "essentially copies" of commercially available drug products.

== Research ==
Cyclical therapy with 150 mg hydroxyprogesterone caproate by intramuscular injection was found to be effective in the treatment of 76 women with persistent, treatment-refractory acne in a preliminary study, with 84% responding to the therapy and experiencing a "good-to-excellent" improvement in symptoms.

Hydroxyprogesterone caproate was studied by Schering for use as a progestogen-only injectable contraceptive at a dose of 250 to 500 mg once a month by intramuscular injection but produced poor cycle control at these doses and was never marketed.

Hydroxyprogesterone caproate by itself has been found to have little or no effectiveness in the treatment of breast cancer in women. Conversely, the combination of estradiol valerate and hydroxyprogesterone caproate has been found to be effective in the treatment of breast cancer in women. Initial research based on limited clinical data reported that the breast-cancer response rate with a combination of estradiol valerate and hydroxyprogesterone caproate seemed to be greater than with an estrogen alone (35% vs. 50%). However, subsequent research using the related but more potent progestin gestonorone caproate found that the combination of estradiol valerate and gestonorone caproate had effectiveness that was not significantly different from that of an estrogen alone in the treatment of breast cancer in women.

== Veterinary uses ==
The pharmacokinetics of hydroxyprogesterone caproate in various ungulates including cattle, buffalo, sheep, and goat have been studied.
