= Hydroxyprogesterone acetate =

Chemical compound

Clinical data
- Trade names: Prodrox
- Other names: OHPA; 17α-Hydroxyprogesterone acetate; 17α-Acetoxyprogesterone; Acetoxyprogesterone; 17α-Hydroxypregn-4-ene-3,20-dione 17α-acetate; 17α-Acetoxypregn-4-ene-3,20-dione
- Routes of administration: By mouth
- Drug class: Progestogen; Progestin; Progestogen ester
- ATC code: G03DA03 (WHO)

Identifiers
- IUPAC name: [(8R,9S,10R,13S,14S,17R)-17-acetyl-10,13-dimethyl-3-oxo-2,6,7,8,9,11,12,14,15,16-decahydro-1H-cyclopenta[a]phenanthren-17-yl] acetate
- CAS Number: 302-23-8 17308-02-0
- PubChem CID: 10156152
- ChemSpider: 8331660
- UNII: L124O66YSI
- KEGG: D08053
- CompTox Dashboard (EPA): DTXSID90894096
- ECHA InfoCard: 100.005.564

Chemical and physical data
- Formula: C_{23}H_{32}O_{4}
- Molar mass: 372.505 g·mol^{−1}
- 3D model (JSmol): Interactive image
- SMILES: O=C4\C=C2/[C@]([C@H]1CC[C@@]3([C@@](OC(=O)C)(C(=O)C)CC[C@H]3[C@@H]1CC2)C)(C)CC4
- InChI: InChI=1S/C23H32O4/c1-14(24)23(27-15(2)25)12-9-20-18-6-5-16-13-17(26)7-10-21(16,3)19(18)8-11-22(20,23)4/h13,18-20H,5-12H2,1-4H3/t18-,19+,20+,21+,22+,23+/m1/s1; Key:VTHUYJIXSMGYOQ-KOORYGTMSA-N

Hydroxyprogesterone acetate (OHPA), sold under the brand name Prodox, is an orally active progestin related to hydroxyprogesterone caproate (OHPC) which has been used in clinical and veterinary medicine. It has reportedly also been used in birth control pills.

OHPA is a progestin, or a synthetic progestogen, and hence is an agonist of the progesterone receptor, the biological target of progestogens like progesterone.

OHPA was discovered in 1953 and was introduced for medical use in 1956.

== Medical uses ==
OHPA has been used in the treatment of a variety of gynecological disorders, including secondary amenorrhea, functional uterine bleeding, infertility, habitual abortion, dysmenorrhea, and premenstrual syndrome.

OHPA (100 mg) was reportedly marketed in combination with mestranol (80 μg) as a sequential combined birth control pill under the brand name Hormolidin. The preparation was available in the early 1970s. The firm that manufactured it, known as Gador, was based in Argentina.

== Pharmacology ==
=== Pharmacodynamics ===
OHPA is a progestogen and acts as an agonist of the progesterone receptor (PR), both PR_{A} and PR_{B} isoforms (IC_{50} = 16.8 nM and 12.6 nM, respectively). It has more than 50-fold higher affinity for the PR isoforms than 17α-hydroxyprogesterone, a little less than half the affinity of progesterone, and slightly higher affinity than OHPC. Additional studies have reported on the affinity of OHPA for the PR.

OHPA is of relatively low potency as a progestogen, which may explain its relatively limited use. It is 100-fold less potent than medroxyprogesterone acetate, 400-fold less potent than chlormadinone acetate, and 1,200-fold less potent than cyproterone acetate in animal assays. In terms of producing full progestogenic changes on the endometrium in women, 75 to 100 mg/day oral OHPA is equivalent to 20 mg/day parenteral progesterone, and OHPA is at least twice as potent as oral ethisterone in such regards. It is also reportedly more potent than OHPC. OHPA has been found to be effective as an oral progestogen-only pill at a dosage of 30 mg/day.

Relative affinities (%) of hydroxyprogesterone and related steroids
Compound	hPR-A	hPR-B	rbPR	rbGR	rbER
Progesterone	100	100	100	<1	<1
17α-Hydroxyprogesterone	1	1	3	1	<1
Hydroxyprogesterone caproate	26	30	28	4	<1
Hydroxyprogesterone acetate	38	46	115	3	?
Notes: Values are percentages (%). Reference ligands (100%) were progesterone for the PR, dexamethasone for the GR, and estradiol for the ER. Sources: See template.

=== Pharmacokinetics ===
OHPA has very low but nonetheless significant oral bioavailability and can be taken by mouth. The pharmacokinetics of OHPA have been reviewed.

A single intramuscular injection of 150 to 350 mg OHPA in microcrystalline aqueous suspension has been found to have a duration of action of 9 to 16 days in terms of clinical biological effect in the uterus in women.

Parenteral potencies and durations of progestogens (Note: Sources:) (Note: All given by intramuscular or subcutaneous injection.)
Compound	Form	Dose for specific uses (mg) (Note: Progesterone production during the luteal phase is ~25 (15–50) mg/day. The OID of OHPC is 250 to 500 mg/month.)			DOA (Note: Duration of action in days.)
Compound	Form	TFD (Note: Usually given for 14 days.)	POICD (Note: Usually dosed every two to three months.)	CICD (Note: Usually dosed once monthly.)	DOA
Algestone acetophenide	Oil soln.	–	–	75–150	14–32 d
Gestonorone caproate	Oil soln.	25–50	–	–	8–13 d
Hydroxyprogest. acetate (Note: Never marketed or approved by this route.)	Aq. susp.	350	–	–	9–16 d
Hydroxyprogest. caproate	Oil soln.	250–500 (Note: In divided doses (2 × 125 or 250 mg for OHPC, 10 × 20 mg for P4).)	–	250–500	5–21 d
Medroxyprog. acetate	Aq. susp.	50–100	150	25	14–50+ d
Megestrol acetate	Aq. susp.	–	–	25	>14 d
Norethisterone enanthate	Oil soln.	100–200	200	50	11–52 d
Progesterone	Oil soln.	200	–	–	2–6 d
Progesterone	Aq. soln.	?	–	–	1–2 d
Progesterone	Aq. susp.	50–200	–	–	7–14 d
Notes and sources:

== Chemistry ==
OHPA, also known as 17α-hydroxyprogesterone acetate or as 17α-acetoxypregn-4-ene-3,20-dione, is a synthetic pregnane steroid and a derivative of progesterone. It is the acetate ester of 17α-hydroxyprogesterone, as well as a parent compound of a number of progestins including chlormadinone acetate, cyproterone acetate, medroxyprogesterone acetate, and megestrol acetate.

=== Synthesis ===
Chemical syntheses of OHPA have been described.

== History ==
In 1949, it was discovered that 17α-methylprogesterone had twice the progestogenic activity of progesterone when administered parenterally, and this finding led to renewed interest in 17α-substituted derivatives of progesterone as potential progestins. Along with OHPC, OHPA was synthesized by Karl Junkmann of Schering AG in 1953 and was first reported by him in the medical literature in 1954. OHPC shows very low oral activity and was introduced for use via intramuscular injection by Squibb in 1956 under the brand name Delalutin. Although a substantial prolongation of action occurs when OHPC is formulated in oil, the same was not observed to a significant extent with OHPA, and this is likely why OHPC was chosen by Schering for development over OHPA.

Subsequently, Upjohn unexpectedly discovered that OHPA, unlike OHPC and progesterone, is orally active and shows marked progestogenic activity with oral administration, a finding that had been missed by the Schering researchers (who were primarily interested in the oil solubility of such esters). OHPA was found to possess two to three times the oral activity of 17α-methylprogesterone. Upjohn reported the oral activity of OHPA in the medical literature in 1957 and introduced the drug for medical use as Prodox in 25 mg and 50 mg oral tablet formulations later the same year. OHPA was indicated for the treatment of a variety of gynecological disorders in women. However, it saw relatively little use, which was perhaps due its comparatively low potency relative to a variety of other progestins such as medroxyprogesterone acetate and norethisterone. These progestins were introduced around the same time and hence may have been favored.

In 1960, OHPA was introduced also as Prodox as an oral progestin for veterinary use for the indication of estrus suppression in dogs. However, probably due its high cost and the inconvenience of daily oral administration, the drug was not a market success. It was superseded for this indication by medroxyprogesterone acetate (brand name Promone) in 1963, which could be administered by injection conveniently once every six months, although this preparation was discontinued in 1966 for various reasons and hence was not a market success either.

== Society and culture ==
=== Generic names ===
Hydroxyprogesterone acetate is the generic name of the drug and its INN.

=== Brand names ===
OHPA is or was marketed under the brand name Prodox initially for clinical use and then for veterinary use. Other brand names of OHPA include Gestageno, Gestageno Gador, Kyormon, Lutate-Inj, Prodix, and Prokan. OHPA may also be or have been marketed in combination with estradiol enantate under the brand names Atrimon and Protegin in Argentina and Nicaragua.

=== Availability ===
OHPA is no longer marketed and hence is no longer available in any country.

== See also ==
- Mestranol/hydroxyprogesterone acetate
