= C28H42O4 =

The molecular formula C_{28}H_{42}O_{4} (molar mass: 442.63 g/mol) may refer to:

- Hydroxyprogesterone heptanoate (OHPH), or OHPE
- Medroxyprogesterone caproate (MPC)
