= AMAG =

AMAG may refer to:

- American Mission for Aid to Greece, Cold War mission established under the Truman Doctrine
- Austria Metall AG, an Austrian metal manufacturer
- AMAG Group AG, a Swiss automobile importer
- Asian Martial Arts Games
- AMAG Pharmaceuticals
