= Ther =

Ther may refer to:

- Thér., taxonomic author abbreviation of Irénée Thériot (1859–1947), French bryologist
- Agroha Mound, archaeological site in Agroha, Hisar district, India
- Philipp Ther – German historian
- Therapy
- Therapeutic drugs

== See also ==
- Ther Thiruvizha, 1968 Indian Tamil-language drama film
- Ther-Rx Company, subsidiary of KV Pharmaceutical
