= Methenmadinone caproate =

Chemical compound

Clinical data
- Other names: MMC; Superlutin caproate; Methenmadinone hexanoate; Lutofollin; 17α-Hydroxy-16-methyl-6-dehydroprogesterone caproate; 17α-Hydroxy-16-methylpregna-4,6-diene-3,20-dione 17α-hexanoate
- Routes of administration: Intramuscular injection
- Drug class: Progestogen; Progestin; Progestogen ester

Identifiers
- IUPAC name: [(8R,9S,10R,13S,14S,17R)-17-Acetyl-10,13-dimethyl-16-methylene-3-oxo-2,3,8,9,10,11,12,13,14,15,16,17-dodecahydro-1H-cyclopenta[a]phenanthren-17-yl] hexanoate
- CAS Number: 6723-94-0
- PubChem CID: 164888944
- ChemSpider: 129864919
- UNII: T7YQK45FEA

Chemical and physical data
- Formula: C_{28}H_{38}O_{4}
- Molar mass: 438.608 g·mol^{−1}
- 3D model (JSmol): Interactive image
- SMILES: O(C(CCCCC)=O)[C@@](C(C)=O)1C(=C)C[C@]([H])2[C@@]([H])3C=CC4=CC(CC[C@]4(C)[C@@]3([H])CC[C@@]21C)=O
- InChI: InChI=1S/C28H38O4/c1-6-7-8-9-25(31)32-28(19(3)29)18(2)16-24-22-11-10-20-17-21(30)12-14-26(20,4)23(22)13-15-27(24,28)5/h10-11,17,22-24H,2,6-9,12-16H2,1,3-5H3/t22-,23+,24+,26+,27+,28+/m1/s1; Key:WQBCIYORLVRAQX-BDPSOKNUSA-N

Methenmadinone caproate (MMC, also known as superlutin caproate) is a progestin medication which was developed in Czechoslovakia in the 1960s and was studied for potential use in combined injectable contraceptives in the 1970s but was never marketed. It was studied as a combined injectable contraceptive in combination with estradiol valerate at doses of 60 mg and 10 mg, respectively, administered once a month by intramuscular injection (tentative brand name Lutofollin). MMC is the C17α caproate (hexanoate) ester of methenmadinone and an analogue of methenmadinone acetate (MMA; superlutin). In addition to MMA, analogues of MMC include chlormadinone caproate, gestonorone caproate, hydroxyprogesterone caproate, medroxyprogesterone caproate, and megestrol caproate.

== See also ==
- Estradiol valerate/methenmadinone caproate
- List of progestogen esters § Esters of 17α-hydroxyprogesterone derivatives
