= Megestrol caproate =

Chemical compound

Clinical data
- Other names: MGC; Megestrol hexanoate; Megestrol 17α-caproate; 17α-Hydroxy-6-dehydro-6-methylprogesterone 17α-caproate; 17α-Hydroxy-6-methylpregna-4,6-diene-3,20-dione 17α-caproate
- Drug class: Progestin; Progestogen; Progestogen ester

Identifiers
- IUPAC name: [(8R,9S,10R,13S,14S,17R)-17-Acetyl-6,10,13-trimethyl-3-oxo-2,8,9,11,12,14,15,16-octahydro-1H-cyclopenta[a]phenanthren-17-yl] hexanoate
- CAS Number: 65893-91-6
- PubChem CID: 23265655
- ChemSpider: 10420418
- UNII: QL953XUR5F
- CompTox Dashboard (EPA): DTXSID501336300

Chemical and physical data
- Formula: C_{28}H_{40}O_{4}
- Molar mass: 440.624 g·mol^{−1}
- 3D model (JSmol): Interactive image
- SMILES: CCCCCC(=O)O[C@@]1(CC[C@@H]2[C@@]1(CC[C@H]3[C@H]2C=C(C4=CC(=O)CC[C@]34C)C)C)C(=O)C
- InChI: InChI=1S/C28H40O4/c1-6-7-8-9-25(31)32-28(19(3)29)15-12-23-21-16-18(2)24-17-20(30)10-13-26(24,4)22(21)11-14-27(23,28)5/h16-17,21-23H,6-15H2,1-5H3/t21-,22+,23+,26-,27+,28+/m1/s1; Key:XDVHIXRJLWUKRR-ORZTVLAMSA-N

Megestrol caproate, abbreviated as MGC, is a progestin medication which was never marketed. It was developed in Russia in 2002. In animals, MGC shows 10-fold higher progestogenic activity compared to progesterone when both are administered via subcutaneous injection. In addition, MGC has no androgenic, anabolic, or estrogenic activity. The medication was suggested as a potential contraceptive and therapeutic agent.

== Chemistry ==
Megestrol caproate, also known as megestrol 17α-caproate, as well as 17α-hydroxy-6-dehydro-6-methylprogesterone 17α-caproate or as 17α-hydroxy-6-methylpregna-4,6-diene-3,20-dione 17α-caproate, is a synthetic pregnane steroid and a derivative of progesterone and 17α-hydroxyprogesterone. It is the C17α caproate (hexanoate) ester of megestrol. Closely related medications include megestrol acetate (MGA; megestrol 17α-acetate), acetomepregenol (megestrol 3β,17α-diacetate), and cymegesolate (megestrol 17α-acetate 3β-cypionate). In addition to MGA, analogues of MGC include chlormadinone caproate, gestonorone caproate, hydroxyprogesterone caproate, medroxyprogesterone caproate, and methenmadinone caproate.

== See also ==
- List of Russian drugs
