= Alkylamidase =

Class of enzymes

alkylamidase

Identifiers
- EC no.: 3.5.1.39
- CAS no.: 62213-19-8

Databases
- BRENDA: enzyme data
- ExPASy: NiceZyme view
- KEGG: enzyme entry
- MetaCyc: metabolic pathway
- Rhea: reactions
- PDB structures: RCSB PDB PDBe PDBsum
- Gene Ontology: AmiGO / QuickGO
Search
- PMC: articles
- PubMed: articles
- NCBI: proteins

In enzymology, an alkylamidase (EC 3.5.1.39) is an enzyme that catalyzes the chemical reaction

N-methylhexanamide + H_{2}O $\rightleftharpoons$ hexanoate + methylamine

Thus, the two substrates of this enzyme are N-methylhexanamide and H_{2}O, whereas its two products are hexanoate and methylamine.

This enzyme belongs to the family of hydrolases, those acting on carbon-nitrogen bonds other than peptide bonds, specifically in linear amides. The systematic name of this enzyme class is N-methylhexanamide amidohydrolase.
