= Estradiol valerate/gestonorone caproate =

Combination drug

Estradiol valerate / gestonorone caproate

- Estradiol valerate (top) and gestonorone caproate (bottom)

Combination of
- Estradiol valerate: Estrogen
- Gestonorone caproate: Progestogen

Clinical data
- Other names: EV/GC; EV/NOHPC; EV/OHNPC; SH-834; SH-8.0834
- Routes of administration: Intramuscular injection

Estradiol valerate/gestonorone caproate (EV/GC), known by the developmental code names SH-834 and SH-8.0834, is a high-dose combination medication of estradiol valerate (EV), an estrogen, and gestonorone caproate (GC; norhydroxyprogesterone caproate), a progestin, which was developed and studied by Schering in the 1960s and 1970s for potential use in the treatment of breast cancer in women but was ultimately never marketed. It contained 90 mg EV and 300 mg GC in each 3 mL of oil solution and was intended for use by intramuscular injection once a week. The combination has also been studied incidentally in the treatment of ovarian cancer.

Both high-dose estrogens and high-dose progestogens have been found to be independently effective in the treatment of breast cancer in women. High-dose estrogens show greater and more consistent effectiveness than high-dose progestogens for this indication. The combination of an estrogen and progestogen, specifically estradiol benzoate and progesterone, was first studied in breast cancer in rodents and women by Charles Huggins and colleagues in 1962. Initially progesterone and hydroxyprogesterone caproate were used as the progestogen component in such studies; the need for a more potent progestogen in such combinations led to the development of EV/GC, which was first reported in the treatment of breast cancer in women in 1966. GC is a relatively pure progestogen that has about 5- to 10-fold the progestogenic potency of hydroxyprogesterone caproate in humans. New reports on EV/GC in breast cancer continued until 1976.

Both progesterone and hydroxyprogesterone caproate, which are relatively pure progestogens, have been found to have modest or negligible effectiveness when employed by themselves in the treatment of breast cancer in women. Conversely, progestins with off-target glucocorticoid and/or androgenic activity, such as medroxyprogesterone acetate, megestrol acetate, and 19-nortestosterone derivatives, have been found to have greater and more clinically useful effectiveness in comparison. This has raised the possibility that the beneficial therapeutic effects of progestogens in breast cancer may be more related to their off-target activity than their progestogenic activity. In accordance, a study found that the effectiveness of an estrogen alone and the combination of EV/GC in the treatment of breast cancer in women was not significantly different. This was the last study of EV/GC to be published.

== See also ==
- High-dose estrogen/pseudopregnancy
- List of combined sex-hormonal preparations § Estrogens and progestogens
