= Gestonorone caproate =

Chemical compound

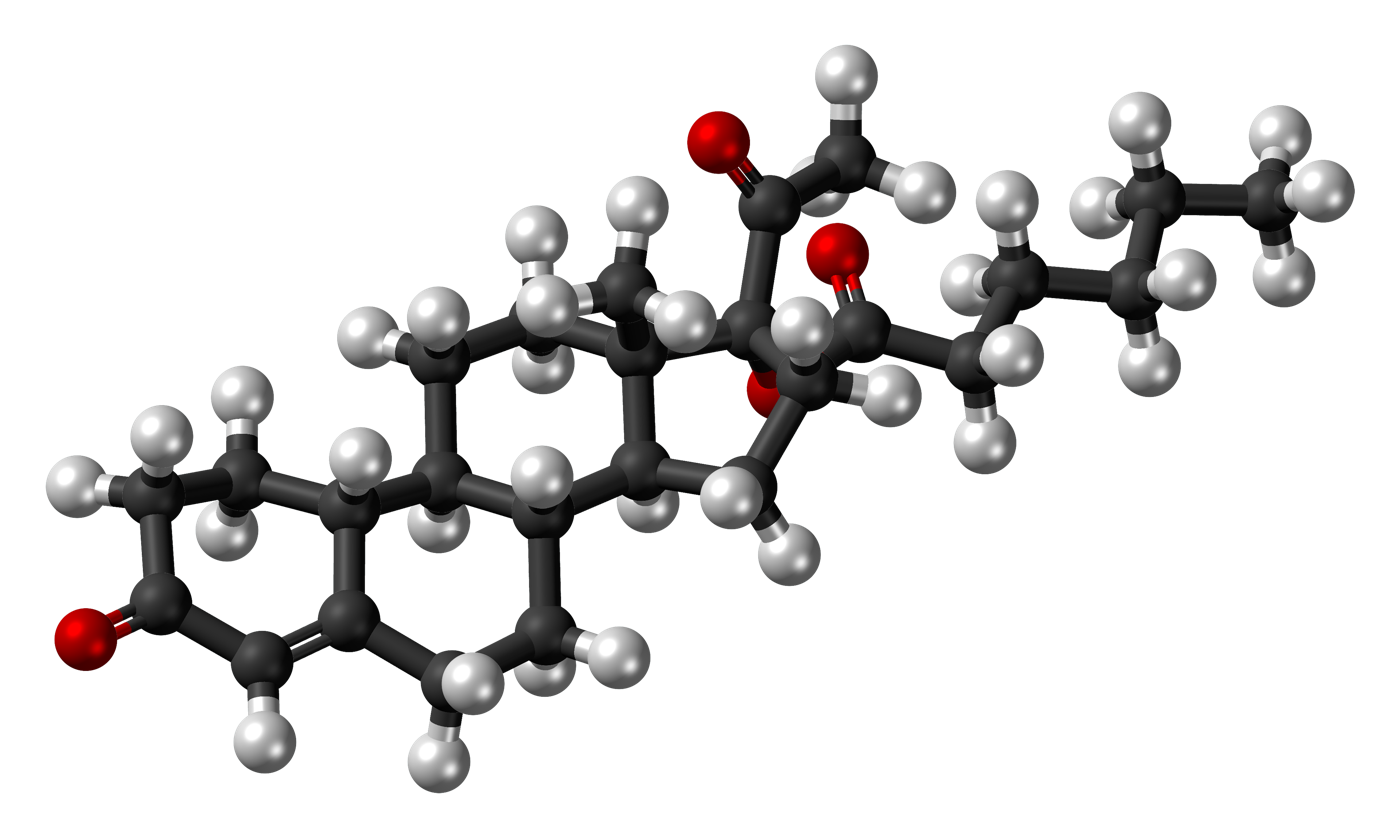

Clinical data
- Trade names: Depostat, Primostat
- Other names: Gestronol hexanoate; Norhydroxyprogesterone caproate; SH-582; SH-80582; NSC-84054; 17α-Hydroxy-19-norpregn-4-ene-3,20-dione hexanoate; 17α-Hydroxy-19-norprogesterone hexanoate
- Routes of administration: Intramuscular injection
- Drug class: Progestogen; Progestin; Progestogen ester; Antigonadotropin
- ATC code: G03DA01 (WHO) L02AB03 (WHO)

Legal status
- Legal status: In general: ℞ (Prescription only)

Pharmacokinetic data
- Bioavailability: Oral: Low; IM: High
- Metabolism: Reduction (at the C5, C3, and C20 positions)
- Metabolites: • 19-Norpregnanetriol • 19-Norpregnanediol-20-one
- Elimination half-life: IM: 7.5 ± 3.1 days
- Duration of action: IM: ≥21 days
- Excretion: Urine: 28% Feces: 72%

Identifiers
- IUPAC name: [(8R,9S,10R,13S,14S,17R)-17-acetyl-13-methyl-3-oxo-1,2,6,7,8,9,10,11,12,14,15,16-dodecahydrocyclopenta[a]phenanthren-17-yl] hexanoate
- CAS Number: 1253-28-7
- PubChem CID: 443881
- DrugBank: DB14677
- ChemSpider: 391969
- UNII: U38E620NS6
- KEGG: D01159
- ChEBI: CHEBI:31650
- ChEMBL: ChEMBL2107389
- CompTox Dashboard (EPA): DTXSID40871837
- ECHA InfoCard: 100.013.646

Chemical and physical data
- Formula: C_{26}H_{38}O_{4}
- Molar mass: 414.586 g·mol^{−1}
- 3D model (JSmol): Interactive image
- SMILES: CCCCCC(=O)OC1(CCC2C1(CCC3C2CCC4=CC(=O)CCC34)C)C(=O)C
- InChI: InChI=1S/C26H38O4/c1-4-5-6-7-24(29)30-26(17(2)27)15-13-23-22-10-8-18-16-19(28)9-11-20(18)21(22)12-14-25(23,26)3/h16,20-23H,4-15H2,1-3H3/t20-,21+,22+,23-,25-,26-/m0/s1; Key:XURCMZMFZXXQDJ-UKNJCJGYSA-N

Gestonorone caproate, also known as gestronol hexanoate or norhydroxyprogesterone caproate and sold under the brand names Depostat and Primostat, is a progestin medication which is used in the treatment of enlarged prostate and cancer of the endometrium. It is given by injection into muscle typically once a week.

Side effects of gestonorone caproate include worsened glucose tolerance, decreased libido in men, and injection site reactions. Gestonorone caproate is a progestin, or a synthetic progestogen, and hence is an agonist of the progesterone receptor, the biological target of progestogens like progesterone. It has no other important hormonal activity.

Gestonorone caproate was discovered in 1960 and was introduced for medical use by 1973. It has been used widely throughout Europe, including in the United Kingdom, and has also been marketed in certain other countries such as Japan, China, and Mexico. However, it has since mostly been discontinued, and it remains available today only in a handful of countries, including the Czech Republic, Japan, Mexico, and Russia.

== Medical uses ==
Gestonorone caproate is used in the palliative treatment of benign prostatic hyperplasia and endometrial cancer. It is used at a dose of 100 to 200 mg once a week by intramuscular injection.

== Side effects ==
Side effects of gestonorone caproate have been reported to include worsened glucose tolerance, decreased libido in men, and local injection site reactions such as irritation.

== Pharmacology ==
=== Pharmacodynamics ===
Gestonorone caproate is a potent, long-acting, and pure progestogen, possessing no androgenic, anabolic, antiandrogenic, estrogenic, antiestrogenic, glucocorticoid, mineralocorticoid, or teratogenic effects. It is approximately 20 to 25 times more potent than progesterone or hydroxyprogesterone caproate in animal bioassays when all are given by subcutaneous injection. In humans, 100 or 200 mg intramuscular gestonorone caproate has been said to be equivalent to 1,000 mg intramuscular hydroxyprogesterone caproate. Hence, gestonorone caproate is approximately 5- to 10-fold more potent than hydroxyprogesterone caproate in humans. The biological effects of gestonorone caproate in women have been studied.

Like other potent progestins, gestonorone caproate possesses potent antigonadotropic activity and is capable of markedly suppressing the gonadal production and circulating levels of sex hormones such as testosterone and estradiol. A clinical study found that 400 mg/week intramuscular gestonorone caproate suppressed testosterone levels by 75% in men, while orchiectomy as a comparator reduced testosterone levels by 91%. Levels of luteinizing hormone, conversely, remained unchanged. In general, progestogens can maximally suppress testosterone levels by about 70 to 80%. In accordance with its lack of glucocorticoid activity, gestonorone caproate has no anticorticotropic effects, and does not influence the secretion of adrenocorticotropic hormone.

17α-Hydroxyprogesterone has weak progestogenic activity, but C17α esterification results in higher progestogenic activity. Of a variety of different esters, the caproate (hexanoate) ester was found to have the strongest progestogenic activity, and this formed the basis for the development of gestonorone caproate, as well as other caproate progestogen esters such as hydroxyprogesterone caproate.

Gestonorone caproate has been found to decrease the weights of the prostate gland and seminal vesicles by 40 to 70% in adult male rats. It has been shown in canines to mediate these effects both via its antigonadotropic effects and by direct actions in these tissues. Gestonorone caproate decreases the uptake of testosterone into the prostate gland. It has also been found to have direct antiproliferative effects on human ovarian cancer cells in vitro.

Gestonorone caproate has been reported to act to some extent as a 5α-reductase inhibitor, similarly to progesterone.

Parenteral potencies and durations of progestogens (Note: Sources:) (Note: All given by intramuscular or subcutaneous injection.)
Compound	Form	Dose for specific uses (mg) (Note: Progesterone production during the luteal phase is ~25 (15–50) mg/day. The OID of OHPC is 250 to 500 mg/month.)			DOA (Note: Duration of action in days.)
Compound	Form	TFD (Note: Usually given for 14 days.)	POICD (Note: Usually dosed every two to three months.)	CICD (Note: Usually dosed once monthly.)	DOA
Algestone acetophenide	Oil soln.	–	–	75–150	14–32 d
Gestonorone caproate	Oil soln.	25–50	–	–	8–13 d
Hydroxyprogest. acetate (Note: Never marketed or approved by this route.)	Aq. susp.	350	–	–	9–16 d
Hydroxyprogest. caproate	Oil soln.	250–500 (Note: In divided doses (2 × 125 or 250 mg for OHPC, 10 × 20 mg for P4).)	–	250–500	5–21 d
Medroxyprog. acetate	Aq. susp.	50–100	150	25	14–50+ d
Megestrol acetate	Aq. susp.	–	–	25	>14 d
Norethisterone enanthate	Oil soln.	100–200	200	50	11–52 d
Progesterone	Oil soln.	200	–	–	2–6 d
Progesterone	Aq. soln.	?	–	–	1–2 d
Progesterone	Aq. susp.	50–200	–	–	7–14 d
Notes and sources:

=== Pharmacokinetics ===
Like the closely related progestins hydroxyprogesterone caproate and 19-norprogesterone, gestonorone caproate shows poor activity orally and must be administered parenterally; specifically, via intramuscular injection. Gestonorone caproate is administered by intramuscular injection, and acts as a long-lasting depot by this route. After an intramuscular injection, gestonorone caproate is completely released from the local depot and is highly bioavailable. A single intramuscular injection of 25 to 50 mg gestonorone caproate in oil solution has been found to have a duration of action of 8 to 13 days in terms of clinical biological effect in the uterus in women. At high doses, the duration of action of gestonorone caproate by intramuscular injection has been found to be at least 21 days. Clinical studies have found gestonorone caproate to be satisfactorily effective as a progestogen when injected once a month, whereas it was poorly effective as an injectable contraceptive when it was injected once every two months.

Following a single intramuscular injection of 200 mg radiolabeled gestonorone caproate in 1 mL of solution in men with prostate cancer, maximal levels of gestonorone caproate occurred after 3 ± 1 days and were 420 ± 160 ng/mL. The elimination half-life of gestonorone caproate and its metabolites was 7.5 ± 3.1 days. Approximately 5% of the radioactive steroid content in the blood was unchanged gestonorone caproate. No free gestonorone was observed in circulation or in urine. Gestonorone caproate and its metabolites were eliminated 72% in feces and 28% in urine. Approximately 48 ± 18% of the injected dose had been eliminated after 14 days and approximately 85 ± 12% of the injected dose had been excreted after 30 days.

The metabolism of unesterified gestonorone (17α-hydroxy-19-norprogesterone) is analogous to that of 17α-hydroxyprogesterone, with the corresponding 19-norpregnane metabolites produced. Gestonorone caproate has been found to undergo 5α-reduction similarly to progesterone, 17α-hydroxyprogesterone, and gestonorone, and at a similar rate as these steroids. Conversely however, due to its caproate ester, 5β-reduction of gestonorone caproate is decreased relative to these steroids. As progesterone is metabolized mainly into 5β-pregnanes, decreased 5β-reduction of gestonorone caproate may be involved in its greater potency compared to progesterone. The major metabolites of gestonorone caproate have been reported to be isomers of 19-norpregnanetriol and 19-norpregnanediol-20-one. These metabolites indicate that gestonorone caproate is metabolized mainly by reduction at the C3, C5, and C20 positions. Following an intramuscular injection of 300 mg gestonorone caproate, only a slight increase in urinary pregnanetriol excretion has been observed. Cleavage of the caproate ester of gestonorone caproate is minimal, which indicates that it is not a prodrug of the unesterified steroid.

== Chemistry ==
Gestonorone caproate, also known as norhydroxyprogesterone caproate, 17α-hydroxy-19-norprogesterone 17α-hexanoate, or 17α-hydroxy-19-norpregn-4-ene-3,20-dione 17α-hexanoate, is a synthetic norpregnane steroid and a derivative of progesterone. It is specifically a combined derivative of 17α-hydroxyprogesterone and 19-norprogesterone, or of gestronol (17α-hydroxy-19-norprogesterone), with a hexanoate (caproate) ester at the C17α position. Analogues and derivatives of gestonorone caproate include algestone acetophenide (dihydroxyprogesterone acetophenide), demegestone, nomegestrol acetate, norgestomet, and segesterone acetate, as well as 18-methylsegesterone acetate and the caproate esters chlormadinone caproate, hydroxyprogesterone caproate, medroxyprogesterone caproate, megestrol caproate, and methenmadinone caproate.

=== Synthesis ===
Chemical syntheses of gestonorone caproate have been published.

== History ==
Gestonorone caproate was first described in 1960. It was developed by Schering and has been marketed since at least 1968.

== Society and culture ==
=== Generic names ===
Gestonorone caproate is the generic name of the drug and its INN, USAN, and JAN, while gestronol hexanoate is its BANM. It has also been referred to as norhydroxyprogesterone caproate, and is also known by its former developmental code names SH-582 and SH-80582.

=== Brand names ===
Gestonorone caproate has been marketed exclusively under the brand names Depostat and Primostat.

=== Availability ===
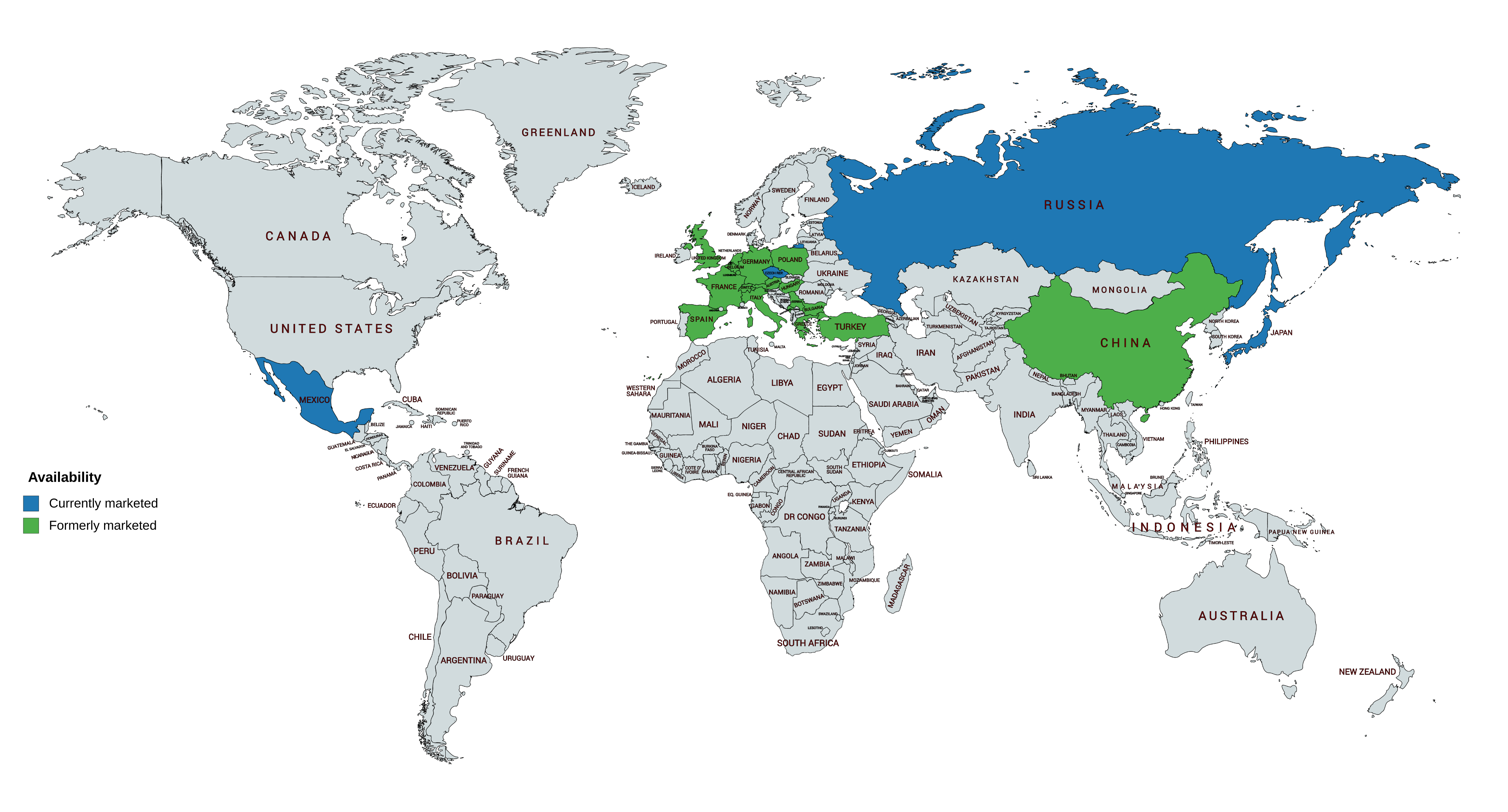
Availability of gestonorone caproate in countries throughout the world as of March 2018. Blue is currently marketed, green is formerly marketed.

Gestonorone caproate has been available widely in Europe, including in the United Kingdom, and has also been marketed in Japan, China, Mexico, and certain other countries. However, it has been discontinued in most countries and its availability is more limited today; it appears to remain marketed only in the Czech Republic, Japan, Mexico, and Russia. It has not been marketed in the United States, Canada, and many other countries.

== Research ==
Gestonorone caproate was studied in the treatment of prostate cancer in men at a dosage of 400 mg per week by intramuscular injection but, in contrast to the case of benign prostatic hyperplasia, was found to be ineffective.

SH-834 was a combination of 90 mg estradiol valerate and 300 mg gestonorone caproate for weekly intramuscular injection that was developed by Schering in the 1960s and 1970s. It was investigated clinically as a treatment for breast cancer and was found to be effective. However, its effectiveness was found to be no better than that of an estrogen alone, and the combination was ultimately never marketed.

Gestonorone caproate was studied by Schering for use as a progestogen-only injectable contraceptive across a dose range of 2.5 to 200 mg once every one or two months but was never marketed. There is very little clinical experience of gestonorone caproate for this indication.

Gestonorone caproate has been studied in the treatment of ovarian cancer (in combination with cyclophosphamide), menstrual cycle-related mouth ulcers, and as a component of menopausal hormone therapy.

== See also ==
- Estradiol valerate/gestonorone caproate
