= Texier =

Texier is a French surname, and may refer to:

- Alexandre Texier (born 1999), French ice hockey player
- Auguste Texier (1851–after 1918), French sailor
- Catherine Texier (born 1947), French-American writer
- Charles Texier (1802–1871), French historian, architect and archaeologist
- François Texier (1849–after 1913), French sailor
- Gaël Texier (born 1975), Canadian taekwondo athlete and coach
- Henri Texier (born 1945), French musician
- Jehan Texier or Le Texier (fl. 15th–16th centuries), better known as Jehan de Beauce, French architect
- Louisette Texier (1913–2021), Armenian-French genocide survivor, résistante and racing driver
- Marie Texier-Lahoulle (1889–1972), French politician
- Mathieu Texier (born 1981), French footballer
- Paul Texier (1889–1972), French cyclist
- Raymonde Le Texier (born 1939), French politician
- René Texier (1882–1967), French sport shooter
- Richard Texier (born 1955), French artist
- Robert Texier (1930–2017), French rower

== See also ==
- Texier's disease
