= Chlormadinone caproate =

Chemical compound

Clinical data
- Other names: CMC; Chlormadinone hexanoate; 6-Chloro-17α-hydroxy-Δ^{6}-progesterone hexanoate; 6-Chloro-17α-hydroxypregna-4,6-diene-3,20-dione hexanoate
- Routes of administration: Intramuscular injection
- Drug class: Progestogen; Progestin; Progestogen ester

Identifiers
- IUPAC name: [(8R,9S,10R,13S,14S,17R)-17-Acetyl-6-chloro-10,13-dimethyl-3-oxo-2,3,8,9,10,11,12,13,14,15,16,17-dodecahydro-1H-cyclopenta[a]phenanthren-17-yl] hexanoate
- CAS Number: 35753-51-6
- PubChem CID: 165354578
- ChemSpider: 129864953
- UNII: RDK6BG5Q4K

Chemical and physical data
- Formula: C_{27}H_{37}ClO_{4}
- Molar mass: 461.04 g·mol^{−1}
- 3D model (JSmol): Interactive image
- SMILES: O(C(CCCCC)=O)[C@@](C(C)=O)1CC[C@]([H])2[C@@]([H])3C=C(Cl)C4=CC(CC[C@]4(C)[C@@]3([H])CC[C@@]21C)=O
- InChI: InChI=1S/C27H37ClO4/c1-5-6-7-8-24(31)32-27(17(2)29)14-11-21-19-16-23(28)22-15-18(30)9-12-25(22,3)20(19)10-13-26(21,27)4/h15-16,19-21H,5-14H2,1-4H3/t19-,20+,21+,25-,26+,27+/m1/s1; Key:VNEYSFJFVXCAHG-BRWSOWNCSA-N

Chlormadinone caproate (CMC) is a progestin and a progestogen ester which was studied for potential use in combined injectable contraceptives but was never marketed. It was assessed in combination with estradiol valerate at doses of 80 mg and 3 mg, respectively. In addition to chlormadinone acetate (CMA), analogues of CMC include gestonorone caproate, hydroxyprogesterone caproate, medroxyprogesterone caproate, megestrol caproate, and methenmadinone caproate.

== See also ==
- List of progestogen esters § Esters of 17α-hydroxyprogesterone derivatives
