= Mestranol/hydroxyprogesterone acetate =

Combination drug

Mestranol / hydroxyprogesterone acetate

- Mestranol (top) and hydroxyprogesterone acetate (bottom)

Combination of
- Mestranol: Estrogen
- Hydroxyprogesterone acetate: Progestogen

Clinical data
- Trade names: Hormolidin
- Other names: ME/OHPA; EEME/OHPA
- Routes of administration: By mouth
- Drug class: Estrogen; Progestogen

Mestranol/hydroxyprogesterone acetate (ME/OHPA), sold under the brand name Hormolidin, is a combination medication of mestranol (ME), an estrogen, and hydroxyprogesterone acetate (OHPA), a progestin, which was reportedly used as a sequential combined birth control pill for women in the early 1970s. It was formulated as oral tablets and contained 16 tablets of 80 μg ME, 5 tablets of 80 μg ME and 100 mg OHPA, and 7 placebo tablets (28 tablets in total). The medication was manufactured by the pharmaceutical company Gador in Argentina.

== See also ==
- List of combined sex-hormonal preparations § Estrogens and progestogens
