= Caproate fermentation =

Caproate fermentation is a metabolic process used by different bacteria to utilize different organic substrates for the production of caproic acid (hexanoic acid) as well as other valuable byproducts. Caproic acid is a valuable compound in food industries as a flavor additive, feedstock for chemical industries, antimicrobial agents in the pharmaceutical industry, and more. Though this process is used by varying bacterial species, the most common species utilizing caproate fermentation in its metabolic process is Clostridium kluyveri. This species, as well as others, utilize caproate fermentation through the breakdown of varying substrates for energy production, waste management and increased ability for survival in different environments.

== Chemical structures and properties ==
=== Chemical Structure ===
Chemical Structure of Caproic Acid

Caproic acid is otherwise known as hexanoic acid. In solid state, the acid appears as a white crystalline structure, while when liquid, it appears clear with a yellow tint. Any contact with caproic acid will cause irritation to various parts of the body and is toxic to humans. The acid is formed through β-oxidation which elongates a short chain carboxylic acid origin using lactic acid as the electron donor to drive the process. This is done through a series of reactions driven by varying enzymes.

=== Chemical methods ===
Carboxylic acids and alcohols are required as substrates for caproate fermentation. Due to the danger of high concentrations in these substrates, they must be diluted. This danger factor results in more materials needed and a more meticulous process to perform fermentation, which is costly. Recent studies suggest that food waste can serve as an alternative source for these substrates, potentially reducing cost and waste. The interest in creating more efficient methods for producing caproates—specifically n-caproate (hexanoate) and n-caprylate (octanoate)—has been challenged by the natural efficiency of C. kluyveri. There are many different ways to produce caproate fermentation however, it is difficult to avoid disruption of the cell and effectively produce caproate. To efficiently produce caproate, optimal conditions are required including: pH, temperature, and environmental concentration.

== Process of Fermentation ==
Certain bacterial species convert carbohydrates (like glucose) into caproate (hexanoate), a six-carbon fatty acid.

Throughout this process of fermentation, bacteria anaerobically break down carbohydrates like glucose through a series of biochemical reactions producing caproate. Furthermore, chain elongation of ethanol and acetate is also needed to create caproate. Ethanol is toxic to many bacterial species, so the ethanol must be pretty balanced in the process to ensure caproate production. Studies have found that with an ethanol/acetate ratio higher than 7:3 require no extra electron donors and a 10:1 ratio produced 8.42g/L of caproate. Additional byproducts are formed like hydrogen gas, carbon dioxide, and sometimes butyrate or acetate. Caproate is the main product, hence the name of caproate fermentation.

== Function and Usage ==
Caproic acid a straight-chain saturated fatty acid has a use in many different areas. These areas being things like artificial flavoring because of its esters. This acid is found in different kind of fats and oils of animals. Not only for flavoring but caproic acid can be used in different medicinal applications as well. Caproic acid is used widely by the agricultural industry and can also be used in antibiotics and as lubricants. More recent studies have proposed the idea that caproic acid can be used to ferment organic waste. Considering that organic waste is 46% of the total waste produced each year.

== Research and Industry ==
Following the COVID-19 pandemic, an international market for medium chain carboxylic acids like caproic acid has emerged. This market is estimated to grow to 358.8 million US dollars by 2030. Caproic acid, a MCCA (medium-chain carboxylic acid) having a multitude of implementations that include cosmetics, solvents, fuels, and antibiotic growth-promoting substitutes in animal feed. With such optimistic market growth being estimated, research surrounding the synthesis of caproic acids has increased and new methods are being explored. Among the methods being looked at is caproate fermentation through microbial cultures.
