= Estradiol valerate/methenmadinone caproate =

Combination drug

Estradiol valerate / methenmadinone caproate

- Estradiol valerate (top) and methenmadinone caproate (bottom)

Combination of
- Estradiol valerate: Estrogen
- Methenmadinone caproate: Progestogen

Clinical data
- Other names: EV/MMC; Lutofollin
- Routes of administration: Intramuscular injection

Identifiers
- CAS Number: 61829-06-9

Estradiol valerate/methenmadinone caproate (EV/MMC), known by the tentative brand name Lutofollin, is a combination medication of estradiol valerate (EV), an estrogen, and methenmadinone caproate (MMC; superlutin caproate), a progestin, which was developed for potential use as a once-a-month combined injectable contraceptive but was never marketed. It contained 10 mg EV and 60 mg MMC in 1 mL oil solution and was intended for administration by intramuscular injection once every 4 weeks.

== See also ==
- List of combined sex-hormonal preparations § Estrogens and progestogens
