= CYP3A7 =

Protein-coding gene in the species Homo sapiens

Identifiers
- Aliases: CYP3A7, CP37, CYPIIIA7, P-450(HFL33), P-450111A7, P450-HFLA, cytochrome P450 family 3 subfamily A member 7, P450HLp2
- External IDs: OMIM: 605340; MGI: 88610; GeneCards: CYP3A7
Enzyme activity
EC #	BRENDA	ExPASy	KEGG	MetaCyc
1.14.14.1	↗	↗	↗	↗

Gene location (Human)
Chr.	Chromosome 7 (human)
Band	7q22.1	Start	99,705,036 bp
Band	7q22.1	End	99,735,196 bp

Gene location (Mouse)
Chr.	Chromosome 5 (mouse)
Band	5 G2|5 76.89 cM	Start	137,891,194 bp
Band	5 G2|5 76.89 cM	End	137,919,881 bp
RNA expression pattern
Bgee	Human / Mouse (ortholog); Top expressed in: buccal mucosa cell; liver; right lobe of liver; testicle; gonad; kidney tubule; gallbladder; jejunal mucosa; duodenum; metanephric glomerulus / Top expressed in: duodenum; jejunum; ileum; left lobe of liver; intestinal villus; epithelium of small intestine; epithelium of stomach; left colon; mucous cell of stomach; gallbladder; More reference expression data
BioGPS	n/a
Gene ontology
Molecular function	oxidoreductase activity, acting on paired donors, with incorporation or reduction of molecular oxygen; aromatase activity; oxidoreductase activity, acting on paired donors, with incorporation or reduction of molecular oxygen, reduced flavin or flavoprotein as one donor, and incorporation of one atom of oxygen; iron ion binding; oxidoreductase activity; heme binding; oxygen binding; metal ion binding; steroid hydroxylase activity; estrogen 16-alpha-hydroxylase activity; monooxygenase activity; estrogen 2-hydroxylase activity
Cellular component	endoplasmic reticulum membrane; organelle membrane; intracellular membrane-bounded organelle; membrane; endoplasmic reticulum
Biological process	xenobiotic metabolic process; lipid hydroxylation; steroid metabolic process; estrogen metabolic process
Sources:Amigo / QuickGO
Orthologs
Databases	NCBI: entry; OMA: entry
Species	Human	Mouse
Entrez	1551	13113
Ensembl	ENSG00000160870	ENSMUSG00000029727
UniProt	P24462	Q64464
RefSeq (mRNA)	NM_000765	NM_007819
RefSeq (protein)	NP_000756	NP_031845
Location (UCSC)	Chr 7: 99.71 – 99.74 Mb	Chr 5: 137.89 – 137.92 Mb
PubMed search
- Wikidata
View/Edit Human	View/Edit Mouse

CYP3A7 is an enzyme belonging to the cytochrome P450 family. It is 503 amino acids in size and shares 87% of its sequence with CYP3A4. It carries out a similar role in fetuses that CYP3A4 serves in adults. The gene location is 7q22.1.

The CYP3A group of enzymes are the most abundantly expressed members of the cytochrome P450 family in liver. They are responsible for the metabolism of more than 50% of all clinical pharmaceuticals.

The CYP3A7 enzyme hydroxylates testosterone and dehydroepiandrosterone 3-sulphate, which is involved in the formation of estriol during pregnancy. The CYP3A7 gene is part of a cluster of related genes on chromosome 7q21.1. Naturally occurring readthrough transcription occurs between this gene and the downstream CYP3A51P pseudogene.

== Notable alleles ==
The CYP3A7*1C allele is associated with poor outcomes in some cancer patients, possibly because of the effect of the enzyme on some chemotherapy agents.
