= Medroxyprogesterone caproate =

Chemical compound

Clinical data
- Other names: MPC; Medroxyprogesterone capronate; Medroxyprogesterone hexanoate; 6α-Methyl-17α-hydroxyprogesterone hexanoate; 6α-Methyl-17α-hydroxypregn-4-ene-3,20-dione hexanoate
- Routes of administration: Intramuscular injection
- Drug class: Progestogen; Progestin; Progestogen ester

Identifiers
- IUPAC name: [(6S,8R,9S,10R,13S,14S,17R)-17-Acetyl-6,10,13-trimethyl-3-oxo-2,6,7,8,9,11,12,14,15,16-decahydro-1H-cyclopenta[a]phenanthren-17-yl] hexanoate
- CAS Number: 6678-23-5
- PubChem CID: 62997
- ChemSpider: 56699
- UNII: GNC5BCM98A
- CompTox Dashboard (EPA): DTXSID00216902

Chemical and physical data
- Formula: C_{28}H_{42}O_{4}
- Molar mass: 442.640 g·mol^{−1}
- 3D model (JSmol): Interactive image
- SMILES: CCCCCC(=O)O[C@@]1(CC[C@@H]2[C@@]1(CC[C@H]3[C@H]2C[C@@H](C4=CC(=O)CC[C@]34C)C)C)C(=O)C
- InChI: InChI=1S/C28H42O4/c1-6-7-8-9-25(31)32-28(19(3)29)15-12-23-21-16-18(2)24-17-20(30)10-13-26(24,4)22(21)11-14-27(23,28)5/h17-18,21-23H,6-16H2,1-5H3/t18-,21+,22-,23-,26+,27-,28-/m0/s1; Key:RDNJGIAWTAMGGM-UPIZIACDSA-N

Medroxyprogesterone caproate (MPC) is a progestin and a progestogen ester which was synthesized in 1958 but was never marketed. It has been confused with hydroxyprogesterone caproate (OHPC) and medroxyprogesterone acetate (MPA) in a number of publications. In addition to MPA and OHPC, analogues of MPC include chlormadinone caproate, gestonorone caproate, megestrol caproate, and methenmadinone caproate.

== See also ==
- List of progestogen esters § Esters of 17α-hydroxyprogesterone derivatives
