= Injection site reaction =

Adverse reaction that occurs initially at the site of an injection or infusion

Injection site reactions (ISRs) are reactions that occur at the site of injection of a drug. They may be mild or severe and may or may not require medical intervention. Some reactions may appear immediately after injection, and some may be delayed. Such reactions can occur with subcutaneous, intramuscular, or intravenous administration.

Drugs commonly administered subcutaneously include local anesthetics, drugs used in palliative care (e.g., fentanyl and morphine), and biopharmaceuticals (e.g., vaccines, heparin, insulin, growth hormone, hematopoietic growth factors, interferons, and monoclonal antibodies).

== Signs and symptoms ==
Some reactions, such as pain, may appear immediately. Others may be delayed, such as erythema which may appear 24–96 hours after injection.

ISRs commonly seen with subcutaneous injections include:

- Bleeding and bruising
- Erythema (redness)
- Pain
- Pruritis (itching)
- Swelling
- Induration (hardening of the skin)
- Discoloration

Severe reactions may result in cutaneous necrosis at the injection site, typically presenting in one of two forms: (1) those associated with intravenous infusion or (2) those related to intramuscular injection. Intramuscular injections may produce a syndrome called livedo dermatitis.

== Causes ==
There are many factors that can affect incidence of injection site reactions. They may be related to the drug formulation itself, to the method of injection, or to the patient.

Some factors such as volume of injection and speed of injection seem to not be well correlated with incidence of reaction.

=== Product-related factors ===
- Osmolality – ideally isotonic (~300 mOsm/kg); although hypertonicity allows reduced volume of injection, an upper limit (~600 mOsm/kg) is advised to minimize hypertonicity-induced pain
- Viscosity – lower viscosity leads to more pain
- pH – pH close to physiological to minimize pain, irritation, tissue damage, except when stability or solubility considerations preclude it; a pH above 9 is associated with tissue necroses, and below 3 with pain and phlebitis
- Buffer choice – commonly citrate, phosphate, or acetate; a sodium bicarbarbonate buffer reduces pain
- Preservatives – commonly phenol and benzyl alcohol, phenoxyethanol, methylparaben, or propylparaben

=== Injection-related factors ===
Features of the needle used for injection can affect ISRs:

- Length – shorter needles are associated with less pain
- Diameter – smaller needles are associated with less pain
- Bluntness of the needle tip
- Bevel type – geometry of the needle tip can reduce average penetration force
- Lubrication – silicone (e.g., polydimethylsiloxane) coating decreases the resistance of insertion
- Injection angle – when injecting at a 45° angle, such as when using a long needle, having the bevel up reduces pain

=== Patient-related factors ===
- Anatomical injection site – injection into the thigh is generally more painful than the abdomen
- Injection close to blood vessels
- Low body weight
- Patient movement during injection

== Mechanism ==
The exact mechanism of various reactions differs, and not all reactions are allergic or immunogenic. In some cases there is inflammatory influx, consistent with leukocytoclastic vasculitis (e.g. infiltrating neutrophils, prominent nuclear dust, lymphocytes and eosinophils with local macrophage infiltration). There may be evidence of subcutaneous fat tissue necrosis.

== Prevention ==
Adequate patient education and training on correct procedure for self-administration can lower the incidence rate of reactions.

Rotating injection sites, proper sterilization, and allowing the medication to reach room temperature before injection can help prevent ISRs. Applying a cold compress after the injection may be helpful. When possible, decreasing the frequency of administration may help.

Premedication with antihistamines or corticosteroids does not seem to prevent ISRs.

== Treatment ==
In some cases, reactions and their severity may diminish with subsequent administrations of the drug.

For non-severe reactions, common approaches include:

- Watchful waiting – non-severe ISRs generally resolve on their own over a short duration, typically 3–5 days
- Medications for symptom relief – e.g., antihistamines for itching; paracetamol or NSAIDs for pain
- Cold compress application

For severe reactions, discontinuation of the medication and acute medical treatment of the reaction may be required.

== Prognosis ==
- Ulceration or necrosis require medical intervention
- Discoloration may be (semi)‐permanent
- Non-severe ISRs generally resolve on their own over a short duration, typically 3–5 days

== Epidemiology ==
For many biologics (e.g., monoclonal antibodies), injection site reactions are the most common adverse effect of the drug, and have been reported to have an incidence rate of 0.5–40%.

In trials of subcutaneous administration of oligonucleotides, between 22% and 100% of subjects developed reactions depending on the oligonucleotide.

== See also ==
- Application site reaction
- Vitamin K reactions
- Skin lesion
- List of cutaneous conditions
