= Vitamin K reaction =

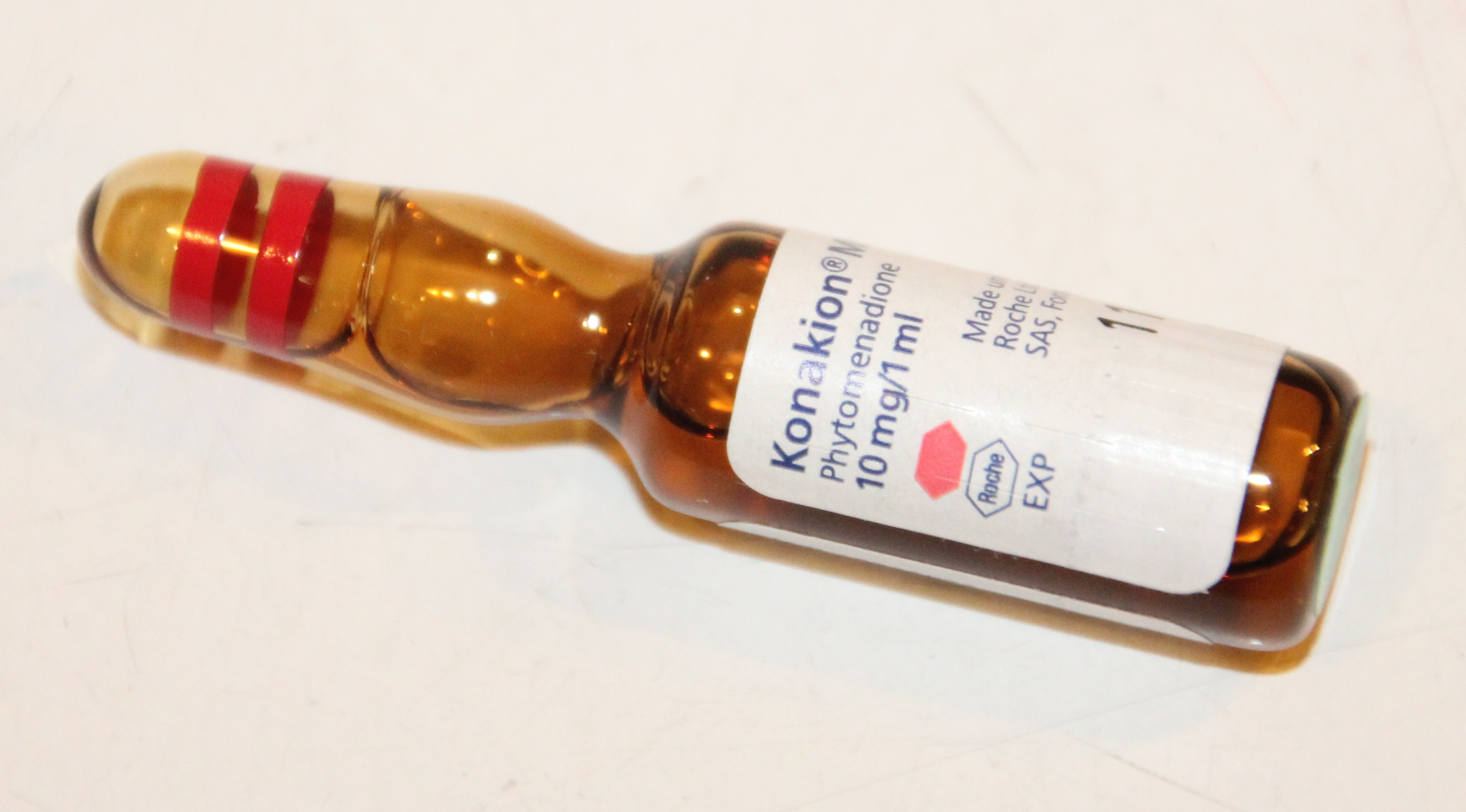
- Phytomenadione (Intravenous Vitamin K1)

Vitamin K reactions are adverse side effects that may occur after injection with vitamin K. The liver utilizes vitamin K to produce coagulation factors that help the body form blood clots which prevent excessive bleeding. Vitamin K injections are administered to newborns as a preventative measure to reduce the risk of hemorrhagic disease of the newborn (HDN).

The coagulation pathway helps the body stop active bleeds by using vitamin K dependent clotting factors (factors II, VII, IX, and X) which are synthesized by the liver. Vitamin K can be delivered into the body via the oral, subcutaneous, intramuscular, or intravenous routes of administration.

Vitamin K can influence bone health, coagulation, and insulin sensitivity, but it can also be effected by bariatric surgery which can result in vitamin K deficiency. Vitamin K reactions, such as dermatological and anaphylactic reactions, can cause itchiness, reddening of superficial skin, difficulty breathing, and changes to blood pressure.

== Background ==
In 1929, Henrik Dam discovered Vitamin K, also known as phylloquinone, phytonadione, or phytomenadione, which is a fat-soluble vitamin. Vitamin K is a family of structures of the aforementioned molecules and is not a single compound. Phytonadione, also known as K1, is synthetically derived, approved by the Food and Drug Administration (FDA) and is available on the market. It is available in many different formulations such as intravenous (IV) route, subcutaneous (SQ) route, intramuscular (IM) route and oral tablet. The package insert for K1 illustrates to avoid the injectable emulsions, however, guidelines advocates for use of injectable emulsions of K1 in urgent situations. Specifically, a boxed warning for IV and IM usage dictates the possible occurrence of mortality or severe reactions. This vitamin is involved in the coagulation pathway and helps create factors II, VII, IX, X, proteins C and S. Vitamin K cannot dissolve in water but fully dissolves in fatty and vegetable oils.

== Importance of vitamin K ==
=== Roles of vitamin K ===
==== Bone health ====
Many proteins in our body depends on vitamin K especially in the bone by carboxylating an amino acid glutamic acid (Glu) to gamma carboxyglutamic acid (Gla). There are controversial results in many studies that suggest the reduction of bone fracture or and increase of bone fracture. Due to these varying results, there are no conclusion in the usage of vitamin K supplements for bone health.

==== Coagulation ====
Blood clotting proteins also depend on vitamin K to stop bleeding.

==== Bariatric surgery ====
People with severe obesity may have undergone bariatric surgery, which promotes intense weight loss and they are more prone to have nutritional deficiency such as vitamin K deficiency. Vitamin K supplementations may be recommended in this population.

==== Insulin sensitivity ====
There has been some evidence to suggest that vitamin K could increase insulin sensitivity in diabetic men as well as help keep INR values from fluctuating for individuals on warfarin therapy.

== Vitamin K administration routes ==
Vitamin K can be administered orally, intravenously (IV), subcutaneously (SQ), and intramuscularly (IM). Of these, intramuscular administration is the least recommended because it can result in hematomas.

Vitamin K that is injected is available as a glass ampule, so a filter should be used prior to administration to avoid glass particles getting into the human body. Unpreserved vitamin K should be used in nursing mothers to eliminate the chance of benzyl alcohol exposure via breastmilk.

No matter the form of administration, supplemental vitamin K should be monitored in people who are on medication for anticoagulation.

== Dermatological reactions ==
There are two patterns of injection site reactions, (1) a reaction may occur several days to 2 weeks after injection with skin lesions that are pruritic, red patches and plaques that can deep-seated, involving the dermis and subcutaneous tissue, or (2) with subcutaneous sclerosis with or without fasciitis, that appears at the site of injection many months after treatment. The latter reaction is known as Texier's disease and lasts several years. Vitamin K reactions can occur on the skin but due to its varying presentation, healthcare providers have a difficult time diagnosing it. After Vitamin K injection is administered there are two potential cutaneous effects that can occur. The first is a local reaction of itchiness, eczema-like texture, indurated erythema on the skin at the injection site. The second is a generalized reaction that can show up as a skin lesion resembling a cyst. The localized reaction takes 4–14 days to develop and can take months to heal.

== Anaphylactic reactions ==
There has been rare reports of oral vitamin K adverse effects. Intravenous vitamin K admission had reports of low blood pressure, shortness of breath, flushing, and other serious allergic reactions. Vitamin K needs to be diluted to an aqueous solution for administration, as it is a fat-soluble vitamin. Reports of hypersensitivity of the diluent with the vitamin K such as castor oil lead to cardiorespiratory arrest.

== Parental vitamin K1 reactions ==
Phytonadione, also known as parental vitamin K1, is a therapeutic that is used to reverse the effects of anticoagulants. There are many severe reactions that can occur within or during 20 minutes post-administration of parental vitamin K1 such as very low heart rate, very high heart rate, very low blood pressure, cardiac arrest, difficult breathing, and death. These types of reactions have been more commonly observed in those that are administered parental vitamin K1 through an IV versus SQ, IM or oral tablets. The emulsion notes of Vitamin K1 prescribing notes dictates that people taking vitamin K1 have reported skin reactions, pain, variable flushing, and interference in taste. Most of the reactions that are observed, can be maintained by polyoxyethylated caster oil. This oil is composed by reacting castrol oil with ethylene oxide. This emulsifier can act as a stabilizer for other medications like cyclosporine, clotrimazole, miconazole, teniposide and paclitaxel. The reactions mentioned earlier do not happen often at a rate of 3 per 10,000 doses when administered via an IV. More importantly, such cases have been associated with mortality which is why the prescribing guidelines indicate and recommends SQ for parental vitamin K1. On the other hand, the British Committee for Standards in Haematology as well as the ACCP guidelines discourages SQ and IM because they have variable and unforeseeable absorption. Higher doses of vitamin K1 administration can cause more reactions to occur when it is not properly diluted, fastly injected, or given at a very high dose. Even with proper administration of vitamin K, people can still have the serious reactions mentioned above.

== Pediatrics ==
Vitamin K may be given to children in the case of deficiency, hemorrhagic disease of newborn, malabsorption syndrome, cystic fibrosis, biliary atresia, hepatic failure, and an antidote to warfarin. However, adverse reactions may ensue. In pediatrics, these reactions may present as changes in taste, skin flushing, feeling dizzy, fast heart rate, excessive sweating, a drop in blood pressure, shortness of breath, and blue coloring of the skin. Less commonly, respiratory and cardiac arrest may result. In the case where the child has a history of severe liver disease, decreased liver function and a decrease in prothrombin production.

Specifically in neonates, an excess dose of vitamin K may result in hyperbilirubinemia, consequences of which are deadly.

=== Hemorrhagic Disease of the Newborn (HDN) ===
The underdeveloped liver of a newborn coupled with poor placental distribution and an uncolonized gastrointestinal tract can result in insufficient vitamin K levels due to the body not being able to use stored vitamin K which increases the risk of HDN. Additional risk factors include 1) infants who never got a vitamin K shot at birth, even more so if they were solely breastfed, 2) infants who had mothers taking medications to treat seizures since these affect how the body uses vitamin K, 3) infants with diarrhea, cystic fibrosis, and celiac disease because this makes it hard to absorb vitamins from foods.

HDN, sometimes referred to as Vitamin K Deficiency Bleeding (VKDB), can lead to serious consequences, such as damage to the brain as a result of uncontrolled bleeding or potentially more fatal outcomes in newborns. Preventative use of vitamin K injections can help reduce risk of HDN. Some parents may refuse the vitamin K shot given at birth to help reduce risk of HDN, and in these cases oral vitamin K can be administered. This alternative is evaluated on a case-by-case basis as there are no guidelines for oral vitamin K for infants in the U.S. Vitamin K supplementation via the oral route of administration may require higher doses in newborns if affected by cholestasis or malabsorption.

== Treatment ==
Adverse effects typically goes away after discontinuing the administration of Vitamin K as the body adjusts to the dose. Severe reactions should be seen by a medical provider for further treatment.

=== Vitamin K as reversal agent for vitamin K antagonists ===
Vitamin K antagonists (VKAs), like warfarin, are often used in those with elevated risks for blood clot formation. VKAs diminish vitamin K levels in the body and inhibit the synthesis of vitamin K dependent clotting factors. Thus, by inhibiting vitamin K, a key element by which the body produces clots, the risk of prolonged bleeding increases. Traditionally, vitamin K has been used as a reversal agent for VKAs. The intravenous (IV) route of administration has a faster onset of action when compared to the oral and subcutaneous routes, thus IV vitamin K is more appropriate in critical situations. However, the intravenous route of administration of vitamin K still takes hours before the vitamin K dependent coagulation factors can be produced by the liver, thus it requires more time for the body to suspend bleeding. In situations where rapid reversal is necessary for those on warfarin, such as in the case of major hemorrhage or surgery, 4-factor prothrombin complex concentrate (4F-PCC) is used with vitamin K to neutralize the effects of VKAs. 4F-PCC is composed of clotting factors that allow for quick reversal of VKAs, thus it compensates for the slow reversal time of vitamin K when administered together.

== Precautions ==
Intravenous administration of vitamin K should only be done by a healthcare facility under the care of a healthcare professional that can provide proper observation of the person in case of an adverse vitamin K reaction. Intravenous vitamin K should only be given in emergencies where benefits outweigh risks when compared to alternative options, as in the case of oral anticoagulant overdose. Adverse effects can be avoided with appropriate dosing, dilution, and slow administration.

== See also ==
- Texier's disease
- Skin lesion
- List of cutaneous conditions
