= KV Pharmaceutical =

Drug company

KV Pharmaceutical Company
- Traded as: NYSE: KVA; NYSE: KVB
- Industry: Pharmaceuticals
- Founded: 1942
- Founder: Bob Keith and Victor Hermelin
- Headquarters: St. Louis, Missouri, U.S.
- Key people: Greg Divis, CEO
- Website: www.kvpharmaceutical.com

KV Pharmaceutical Company (KV) was an American drug company that brought generic and non-branded pharmaceutical products to the market. Headquartered in St. Louis, Missouri, it had research and manufacturing facilities, as well as marketing and sales operations, the latter activities conducted through its subsidiaries, Ther-Rx Corporation and Nesher Pharmaceuticals Inc.

== Background ==
KV was founded by Bob Keith and Victor Hermelin in 1942 who ran the company until 1975, when he was replaced by his son Marc. Marc Hermelin was ousted in 2008 when a Food and Drug Administration (FDA) inspection took place. The following year KV, convicted of felony charges for the "making, marketing, and distribution of adulterated and unapproved drugs", was shut down by the FDA. After a proxy fight, Marc Hermelin returned to the company's board. Between 2008 and 2010, KV lost three-quarters of its workforce, down to 350. KV was reapproved for manufacturing drugs in 2010, while its Ethex manufacturing subsidiary was sold.

Rather than developing new molecular entities, KV focused on unusual modes of drug delivery.

== Makena pricing controversy ==
In February 2011, the FDA granted approval to KV for "Makena" (hydroxyprogesterone caproate or OHPC) for the prevention of premature birth in women with a single fetus of less than 37 weeks gestation who had at least one previous preterm birth. For many years, however, OHPC had been available and used by obstetricians "off label". Before the release of Makena, the drug was compounded by pharmacies for $15, or less, per injection. Typically 15 to 20 injections are given over a treatment course, costing a total of $225 to $300. With the FDA approval of Makena as an orphan drug, KV received the exclusive right to sell the drug for seven years. KV boosted its price by a factor of 100, to $1,500 per injection, or about $25,000 per treatment.

The pricing policy of KV was heavily criticized as it substantially increased medication cost and removed less expensive alternatives. KV indicated that the cost of taking care of a premature birth at about $51,000 justified the cost of the medication, and that a system would be in place to enable patients without means to obtain it. Thus, expenses would essentially fall on the public sector and insurance carriers. A number of physician organizations have opposed the pricing policy of the company as did the March of Dimes that supported the arrival of Makena. The FDA commissioner, Margaret Hamburg, said that the agency was not in a position to influence pricing. Concerned about price gouging, two sSenators, Amy Klobuchar (D-Minn.) and Sherrod Brown (D-Ohio), indicated that they planned to initiate hearings with the Federal Trade Commission about KV's conduct. The controversy spawned protests like the "Shame on You KV Pharmaceutical and CEO Greg Divis" Facebook page.

By the end of March 2011, the FDA announced that pharmacies compounding the drug independently would not face legal reprisal, thus enabling the price of the drug to remain in the $10–20 range. After this announcement, K-V's stock dropped by more than 60% on March 30, 2011, and the company cut the price of Makena to $690 per dose.

== Bankruptcy and acquisition ==
KV Pharmaceutical filed a petition for protection under Chapter 11 of the Bankruptcy Act on August 4, 2012, in the U.S. Bankruptcy Court for the Southern District of New York in Manhattan. The petition listed the company’s assets as $237 million and its debts as $728 million. The filing came on the same day that the company failed to make a $95 million payment it owed to Hologic Inc., KV's partner in developing Makena. The bankruptcy followed a long string of troubles for KV involving oversize morphine tablets, a criminal prosecution and the barring of KV's former chairman, Marc Hermelin, from doing business with federal health programs.

The company emerged from bankruptcy in 2013 with less debt and a $375 million recapitalization, including cancellation of its previous preferred and common stock. Senior secured notes were paid in cash and general unsecured creditors received a pro rata share of $10.25 million. Convertible subordinated noteholders received 7 percent of KV's new common shares in addition to shares purchased through the rights offering or direct purchase of shares.

The company changed its name to Lumara Health, Inc. in May 2014 and, in September 2014, announced that it was being acquired by two different buyers in deals valued at $757 million. AMAG Pharmaceuticals, based in Waltham, Massachusetts, acquired Lumara Health for $675 million in cash and stock, and, in a separate transaction, Perrigo Co. of Dublin, Ireland, acquired Lumara Health's women's health care business, including the Clindesse Vaginal Cream, Gynazole-1 and Evamist products, for $82 million. The AMAG Pharmaceuticals acquisition included the Makena product. Lumara Health now operates as a division of AMAG Pharmaceuticals.

== Products ==
=== Ther-Rx Corporation ===
- Gynazole-1 (butoconazole nitrate vaginal cream, 2%)
- Clindesse (clindamycin phosphate vaginal cream, 2%)
- Evamist (estradiol transdermal spray)
- Makena (Hydroxyprogesterone caproate) (after March 14, 2011)

=== Nesher Pharmaceuticals ===
- Potassium Chloride Extended-Release Capsules, USP
