= AMAG Pharmaceuticals =

U.S. pharmaceutical company

AMAG Pharmaceuticals Inc.
- Type: Subsidiary
- Traded as: Nasdaq: AMAG
- Industry: Pharmaceutical Industry
- Predecessor: Advanced Magnetics Inc.
- Founded: November 9, 1981; 45 years ago
- Fate: Acquired by Covis Group S.à r.l.
- Headquarters: United States
- Products: Pharmaceutics
- Revenue: $418 million (2015)
- Number of employees: 552 (2015)
- Parent: Covis Group S.à r.l.
- Website: www.amagpharma.com

AMAG Pharmaceuticals, Inc. is an American pharmaceutical company developing products that treat iron deficiency anemia (IDA) in adult patients. The company was a publicly traded company listed on NASDAQ under the symbol "AMAG" until November 2020 when it was acquired by Covis Pharma.

In 2016, the company became a member of the Pharmaceutical Research and Manufacturers of America (PhRMA).

== Operations ==
AMAG Pharmaceuticals Inc. operates in the researching, marketing as well as distribution of its drugs. The areas that the company markets its products include the United States, Canada and the European Union.

AMAG's main product, Ferumoxytol was estimated by the company to generate revenue of $71.5 million in 2013.

In August 2013, the company received a new U.S. patent for Ferumoxytol, expiring in 2020.

In June 2015, the company acquired Cord Blood Registry for $700 million.

In 2014, AMAG acquired Lumara Health, formerly KV Pharmaceutical Company.

In 2015, the company's revenue reached $418 million. AMAG had 552 employees.

In December 2018, AMAG announced it would acquire Perosphere Pharmaceuticals Inc.

In October 2020, Covis Group agreed to acquire AMAG for $498 million.

== Drug approvals and distribution ==
The company's research and tests focus on iron deficiency anemia and related intravenous drugs.

In June 2009, the company's main product Ferumoxytol, an IV iron medication used on adult patients with chronic kidney disease, was approved by US Food and Drug Administration.

In December 2011, Health Canada approved Ferumoxytol, under the brand name Feraheme, for use in treating both dialysis and non-dialysis dependent chronic kidney disease patients, as well as for treatment of adult patients with iron deficiency anemia.

From 2010 to 2014, AMAG had a distribution agreement with Takeda which granted them exclusivity to the Canadian and European Union markets, where the drug is sold under the brand names Feraheme and Rienso, respectively.
