= Texier's disease =

- Specialty: Dermatology

Texier's disease is a pseudosclerodermatous reaction that occurs after injection with vitamin K, a subcutaneous sclerosis with or without fasciitis that lasts several years.

== See also ==
- Vitamin K reactions
- Skin lesion
- List of cutaneous conditions
