= Progesterone receptor B =

Isoform of the progesterone receptor

The progesterone receptor B (PR-B) is one of three known isoforms of the progesterone receptor (PR), the main biological target of the endogenous progestogen sex hormone progesterone. The other isoforms of the PR include the PR-A and PR-C.

== See also ==
- Membrane progesterone receptor
