= Progesterone receptor A =

Isoform of the progesterone receptor

The progesterone receptor A (PR-A) is one of three known isoforms of the progesterone receptor (PR), the main biological target of the endogenous progestogen sex hormone progesterone. The other isoforms of the PR include the PR-B and PR-C.

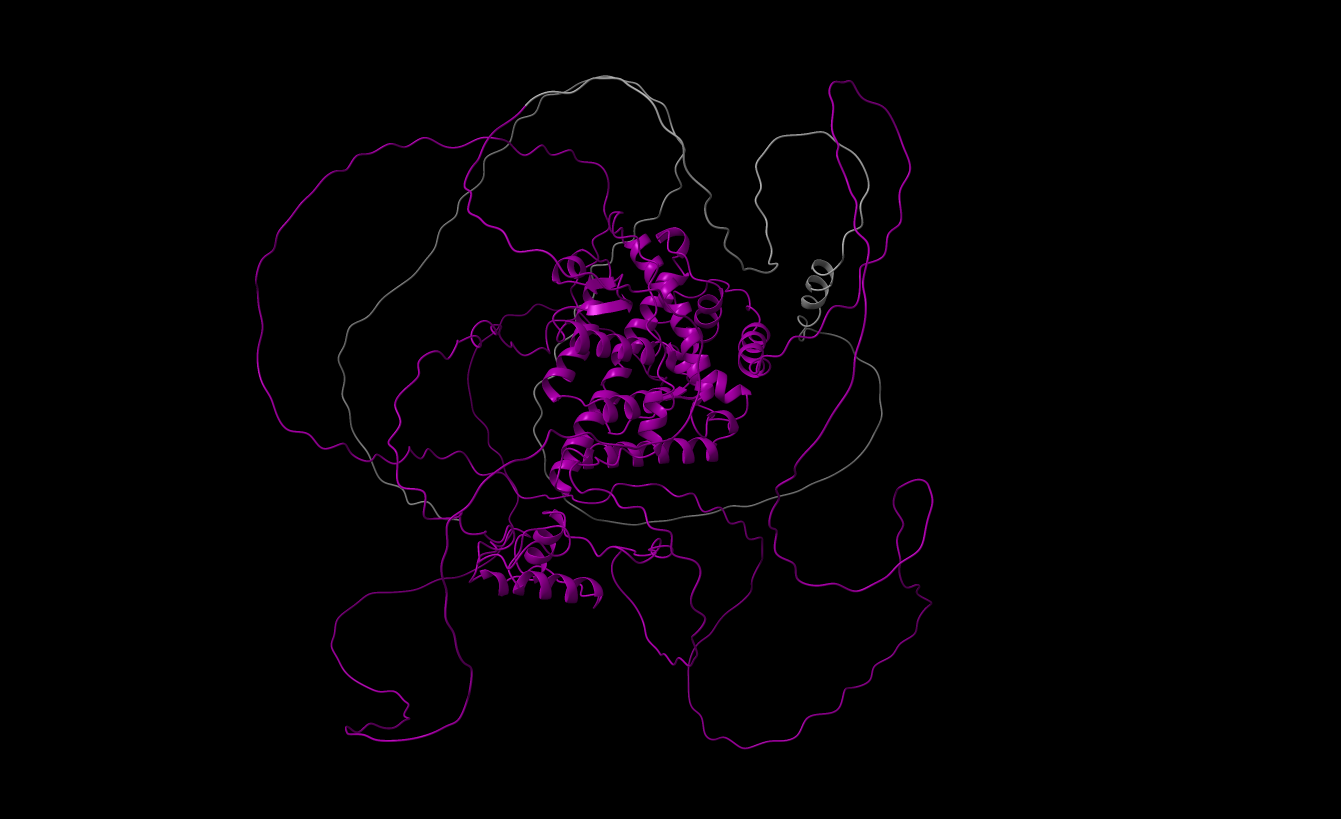
The AlphaFold predictive structure of the entire progesterone receptor with the region unique to isoform A highlighted in purple. Amino acids 1-164 are seen in grey as they are not included in isoform A. AlphaFold Identifier: AF-P060401-F

PR-A is 164 residues shorter than PR-B in humans and anywhere from 128-165 residues shorter in other organisms. Each isoform binds its natural ligand, progesterone, but also demonstrates the ability to bind a number of other agonists including norethindrone, a synthetic progestin.

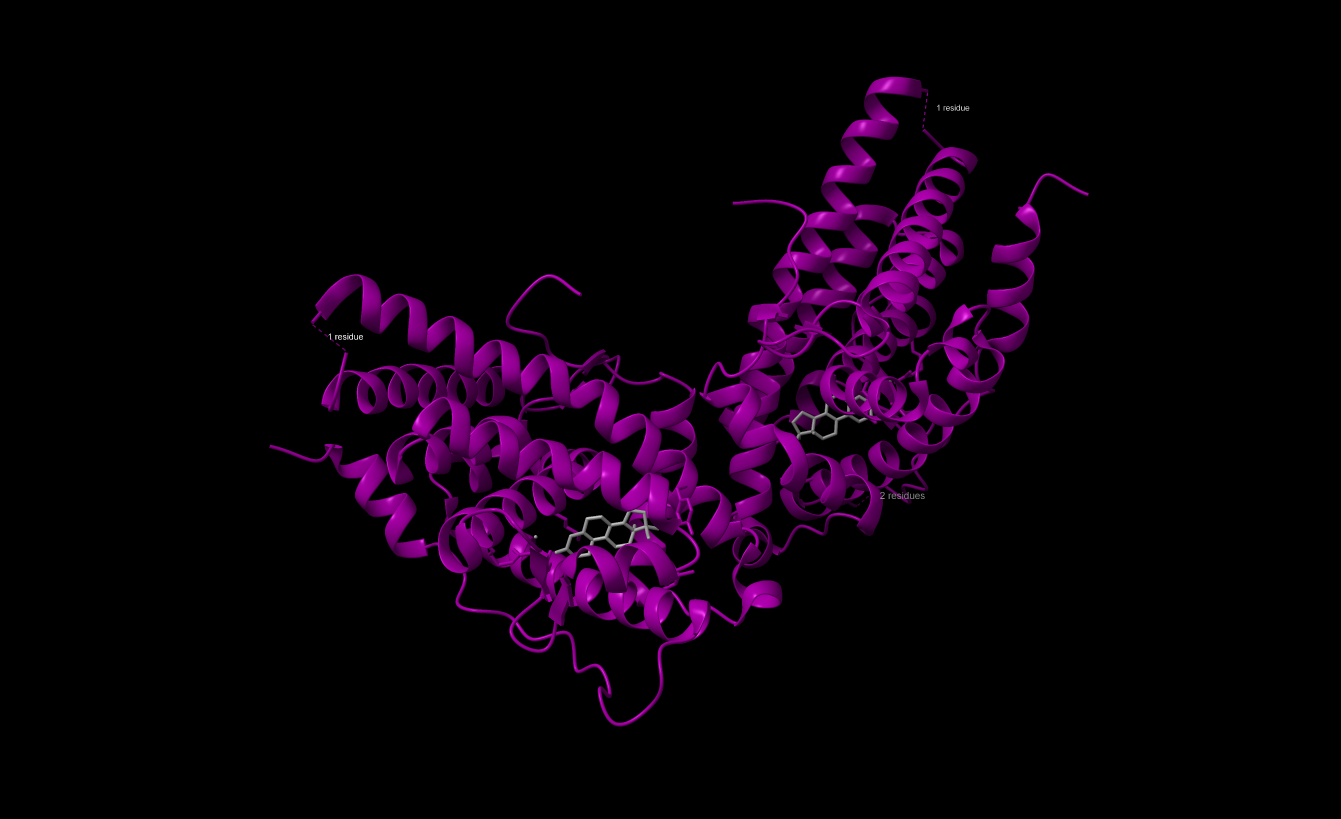
The crystallographic structure of the ligand-binding domain which is common to both isoforms A and B in its dimerized conformation (purple). Dimerization will only occur when a ligand is bound. The study which yielded this structure (Maduass et al. 2004) used agonists mometasone fuorate and norethindrone (grey) to induce dimerization. PBD Identifier: 1SQN

== Expression and overexpression ==
PR-A and PR-B are generally expressed in equal ratios, but PR-A is expressed in larger amounts in uterine stromal cells normally. A spike in PR-A expression in the myometrium has been observed to initiate parturition in placental mammals.

PR-A is the isoform most commonly observed to be overexpressed in human breast cancer. Currently PR is estimated by immunohistochemistry and earlier was quantified by standardized radio-ligand binding assays developed by New England Nuclear and Wittliff. Patients with PR-A rich carcinomas, as opposed to patients with PR-B rich carcinomas, have faster recurrence rates.

== See also ==
- Membrane progesterone receptor
