= Caproic acid =

6-Carbon fatty acid

- Skeletal formula

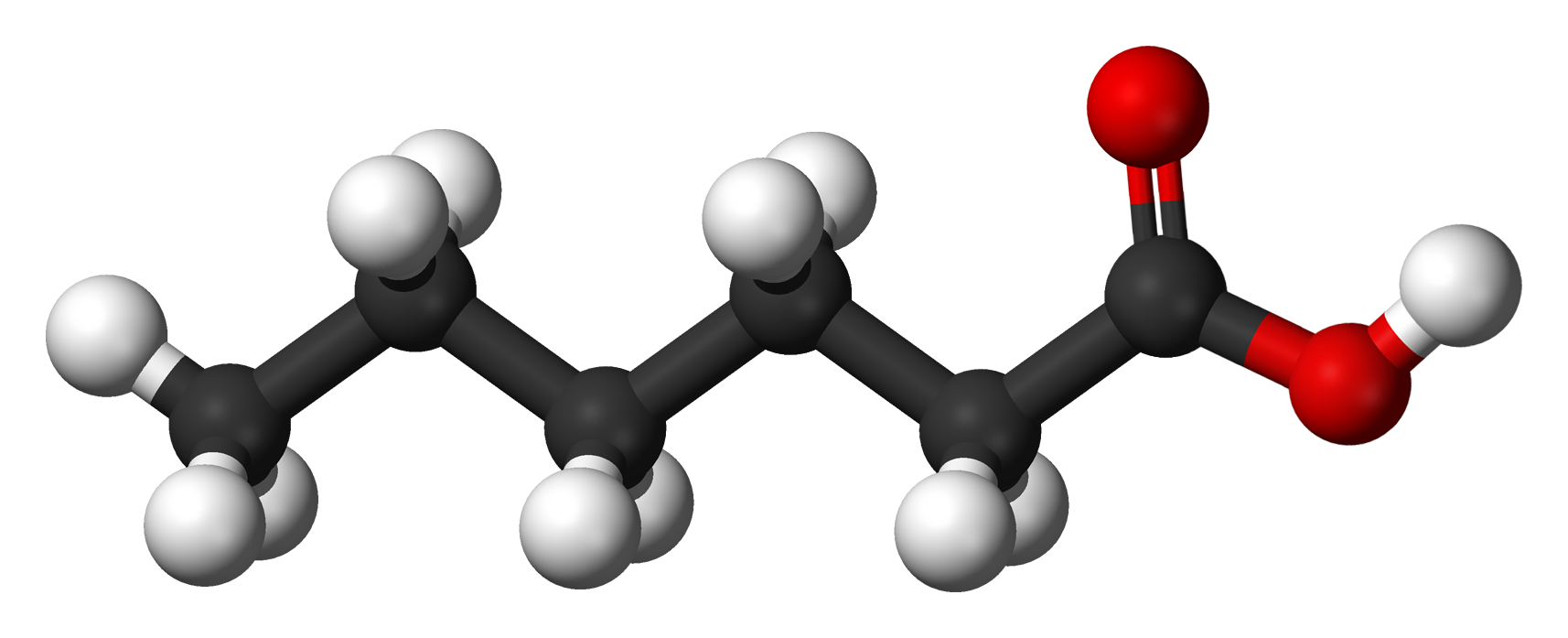
- Ball-and-stick model

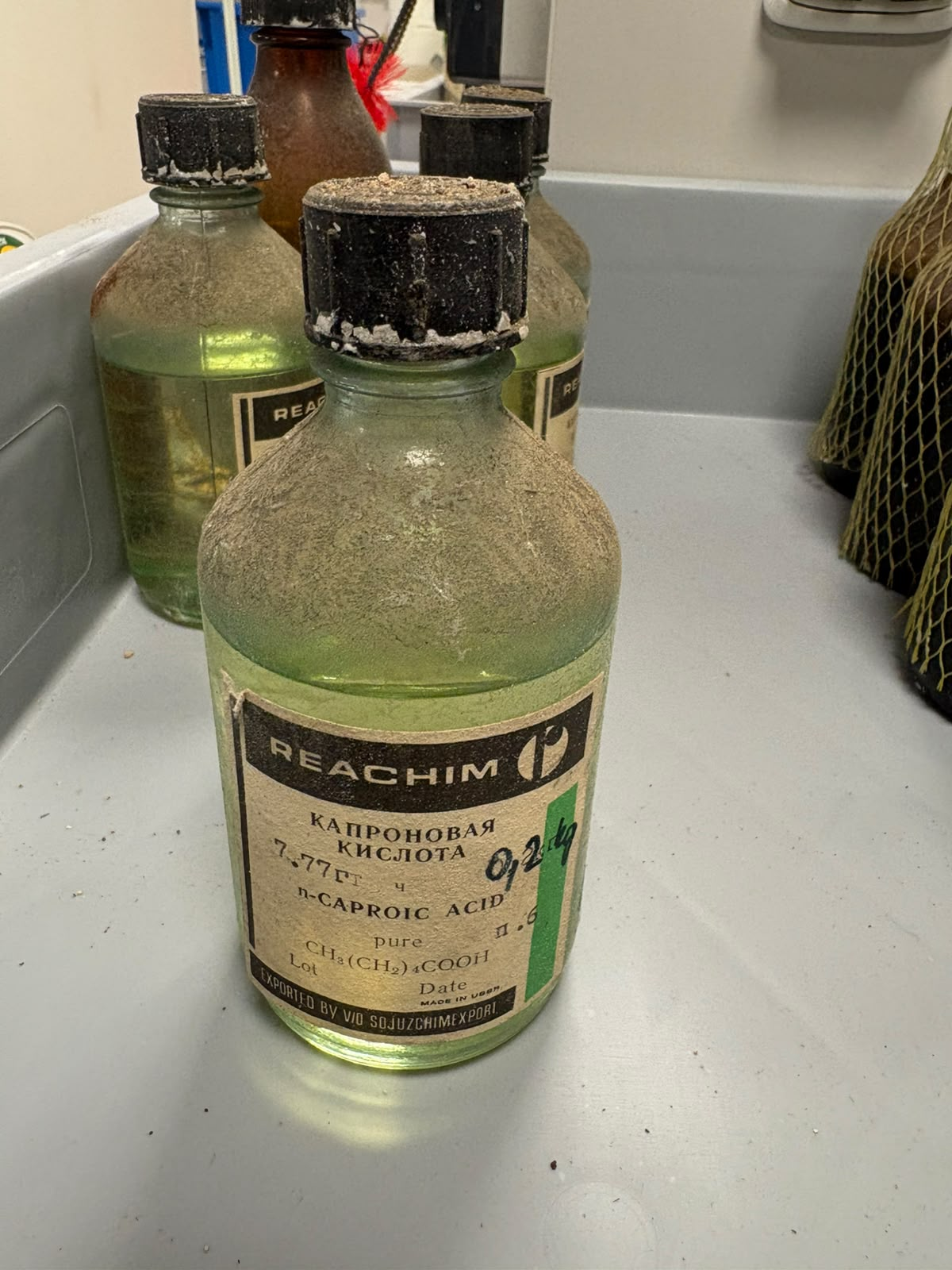
- Bottle of caproic acid

Names
- IUPAC name Hexanoic acid
- Preferred IUPAC name Hexanoic acid
- Other names Hexoic acid Hexylic acid Butylacetic acid Pentylformic acid 1-Pentanecarboxylic acid Chevreul's acid C6:0 (Lipid numbers)

Identifiers
CAS Number	142-62-1
3D model (JSmol)	Interactive image
Beilstein Reference	773837
ChEBI	CHEBI:30776
ChEMBL	ChEMBL14184
ChemSpider	8552
ECHA InfoCard	100.005.046
EC Number	205-550-7
Gmelin Reference	185066
KEGG	C01585
PubChem CID	8892
UNII	1F8SN134MX
CompTox Dashboard (EPA)	DTXSID7021607
- InChI: InChI=1S/C6H12O2/c1-2-3-4-5-6(7)8/h2-5H2,1H3,(H,7,8) Key: FUZZWVXGSFPDMH-UHFFFAOYSA-N; InChI=1/C6H12O2/c1-2-3-4-5-6(7)8/h2-5H2,1H3,(H,7,8) Key: FUZZWVXGSFPDMH-UHFFFAOYAY
- SMILES: CCCCCC(=O)O

Properties
Chemical formula	C_{6}H_{12}O_{2}
Molar mass	116.160 g·mol^{−1}
Appearance	Oily liquid
Odor	goat-like
Density	0.929 g/cm^{3}
Melting point	−3.4 °C (25.9 °F; 269.8 K)
Boiling point	205.8 °C (402.4 °F; 478.9 K)
Solubility in water	1.082 g/100 mL
Solubility	soluble in ethanol, ether
Acidity (pK_{a})	4.88
Magnetic susceptibility (χ)	−78.55·10^{−6} cm^{3}/mol
Refractive index (n_{D})	1.4170
Viscosity	3.1 mP

Hazards
- GHS labelling
Pictograms	(GHS05: Corrosive)
Signal word	Danger
Hazard statements	H314
Precautionary statements	P260, P264, P280, P301+P330+P331, P302+P352, P303+P361+P353, P304+P340, P305+P351+P338, P310, P312, P321, P322, P361, P363, P405, P501
NFPA 704 (fire diamond)	3 1 0
Flash point	103 °C (217 °F; 376 K)
Autoignition temperature	380 °C (716 °F; 653 K)
Explosive limits	1.3-9.3%
- Lethal dose or concentration (LD, LC)
LD_{50} (median dose)	3000 mg/kg (rat, oral)

Related compounds
Related compounds	Pentanoic acid, Heptanoic acid
- Except where otherwise noted, data are given for materials in their standard state (at 25 °C [77 °F], 100 kPa). verify (what is ?) Infobox references

Caproic acid, also known as hexanoic acid, is the carboxylic acid derived from hexane with the chemical formula CH_{3}(CH_{2})_{4}COOH. It is a colorless oily liquid with a fatty, cheesy, waxy odor resembling that of goats or other barnyard animals. It is a fatty acid found naturally in various animal fats and oils, and is one of the chemicals that gives the decomposing fleshy seed coat of the ginkgo its characteristic unpleasant odor. It is also one of the components of vanilla and cheese. Salts and esters of caproic acid are known as caproates or hexanoates.

It was first isolated by French chemist Michel Eugène Chevreul in 1816.

Two other acids are named after goats: caprylic acid (C8) and capric acid (C10). Along with caproic acid, they account for 15% of the fat in goat milk.

Caproic, caprylic, and capric acids (capric is a crystal- or wax-like substance, whereas the other two are mobile liquids) are used for the formation of esters, and also commonly used "neat" in: butter, milk, cream, strawberry, bread, beer, nut, and other flavors.

== Properties ==
Caproic acid is a 6-carbon saturated fatty acid. It occurs in a white crystalline solid form or a colorless to pale yellow liquid state, accompanied by a strong and unpleasant odor. It has limited solubility in water, although it is soluble in dimethyl ether, benzene and other organic solvents.

It may be prepared by fractionation of the volatile fatty acids of coconut oil. Caproic acid belongs to the family of medium chain fatty acids (MCFAs) which can be used to synthesize medium-chain triglycerides.

== Uses ==
The primary use of caproic acid is in the manufacture of its esters for use as artificial flavors, and in the manufacture of hexyl derivatives, such as hexylphenols. Several progestin medications are caproate esters, such as hydroxyprogesterone caproate and gestonorone caproate. Its derivatives are also used in soaps, shampoos, conditioners and gels.

Caproic acid is also used as a component in varnish driers, as well as a lubricant. Its derivatives can also be incorporated to modify the elasticity, strength, and resilience of rubber products.

DHEA-caproate ester (#121) has a IC50 of 0.049nM for the 5-alpha-reductase enzyme.

== See also ==
- List of carboxylic acids
- List of saturated fatty acids
- Caproate fermentation
