= 6α-Methylprogesterone =

Chemical compound

Clinical data
- Other names: 6α-Methylpregn-4-ene-3,20-dione; 6α-MP; 6-MP; 6MP; NSC-75530
- Drug class: Progestogen; Progestin

Identifiers
- IUPAC name: (6S,8S,9S,10R,13S,14S,17S)-17-acetyl-6,10,13-trimethyl-1,2,6,7,8,9,11,12,14,15,16,17-dodecahydrocyclopenta[a]phenanthren-3-one
- CAS Number: 903-71-9
- PubChem CID: 92847
- ChemSpider: 83815
- UNII: YKT998Y6UZ
- KEGG: C14586
- ChEBI: CHEBI:34476
- ChEMBL: ChEMBL433198
- CompTox Dashboard (EPA): DTXSID601294866

Chemical and physical data
- Formula: C_{22}H_{32}O_{2}
- Molar mass: 328.496 g·mol^{−1}
- 3D model (JSmol): Interactive image
- SMILES: C[C@H]1C[C@H]2[C@@H]3CC[C@@H]([C@]3(CC[C@@H]2[C@@]4(C1=CC(=O)CC4)C)C)C(=O)C
- InChI: InChI=1S/C22H32O2/c1-13-11-16-18-6-5-17(14(2)23)21(18,3)10-8-19(16)22(4)9-7-15(24)12-20(13)22/h12-13,16-19H,5-11H2,1-4H3/t13-,16-,17+,18-,19-,21+,22+/m0/s1; Key:GNFABWAPJFOZSF-KTORGGLSSA-N

6α-Methylprogesterone (6α-MP) is a progestin which was never marketed. It has 150% of the progestogenic potency of progesterone. In addition, and in contrast to progesterone, 6α-MP has weak androgenic, antiandrogenic, and synandrogenic actions. 6α-MP is structurally related to medroxyprogesterone acetate (MPA; 6α-methyl-17α-acetoxyprogesterone) and megestrol acetate (MGA; 6-dehydro-6-methyl-17α-acetoxyprogesterone), which possess androgenic and/or antiandrogenic activity to varying degrees similarly. MPA is more androgenic than 6α-MP and MGA.
