= Megestrol acetate =

Pharmaceutical drug

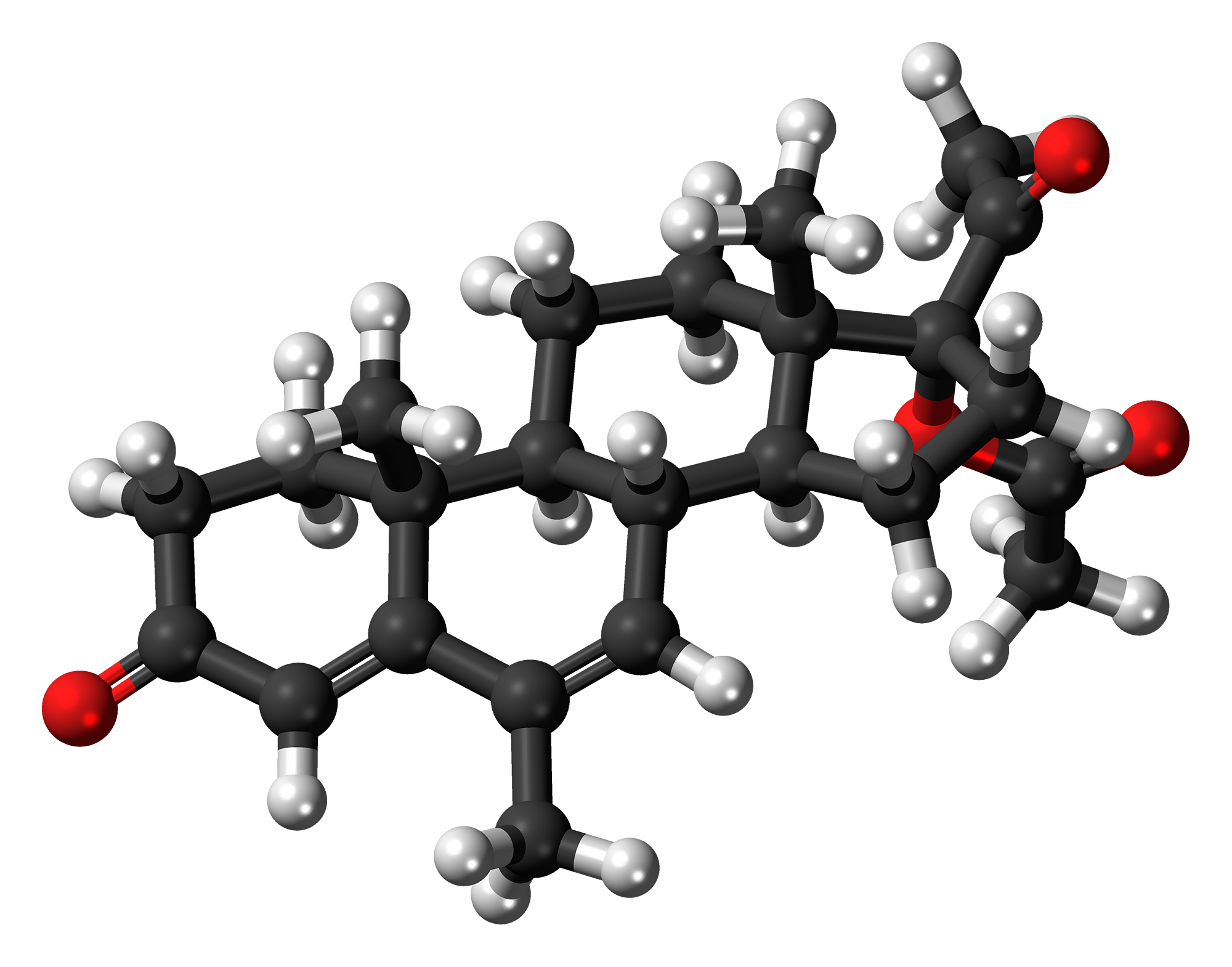

Clinical data
- Trade names: Megace, others
- Other names: MGA; BDH-1298; NSC-71423; SC-10363; 17α-Acetoxy-6-dehydro-6-methylprogesterone; 17α-Acetoxy-6-methylpregna-4,6-diene-3,20-dione
- License data: US DailyMed: Megesterol acetate
- Routes of administration: By mouth
- Drug class: Progestogen; Progestin; Progestogen ester; Antigonadotropin; Steroidal antiandrogen
- ATC code: G03AC05 (WHO) G03DB02 (WHO), L02AB01 (WHO), G03FA08 (WHO), G03FB04 (WHO), G03AA04 (WHO), G03AB01 (WHO)

Legal status
- Legal status: US: ℞-only; In general: ℞ (Prescription only)

Pharmacokinetic data
- Bioavailability: 100%
- Protein binding: 82% to albumin, no affinity for SHBG or CBG
- Metabolism: Liver (hydroxylation, reduction, conjugation)
- Elimination half-life: Mean: 34 hours Range: 13–105 hours
- Excretion: Urine: 57–78% Feces: 8–30%

Identifiers
- IUPAC name: [(8R,9S,10R,13S,14S,17R)-17-acetyl-6,10,13-trimethyl-3-oxo-2,8,9,11,12,14,15,16-octahydro-1H-cyclopenta[a]phenanthren-17-yl] acetate
- CAS Number: 595-33-5
- PubChem CID: 11683
- DrugBank: DB00351
- ChemSpider: 11192
- UNII: TJ2M0FR8ES
- KEGG: D00952
- ChEBI: CHEBI:6723
- CompTox Dashboard (EPA): DTXSID9040683
- ECHA InfoCard: 100.008.969

Chemical and physical data
- Formula: C_{24}H_{32}O_{4}
- Molar mass: 384.516 g·mol^{−1}
- 3D model (JSmol): Interactive image
- SMILES: CC1=C[C@@H]2[C@H](CC[C@]3([C@H]2CC[C@@]3(C(=O)C)OC(=O)C)C)[C@@]4(C1=CC(=O)CC4)C
- InChI: InChI=1S/C24H32O4/c1-14-12-18-19(22(4)9-6-17(27)13-21(14)22)7-10-23(5)20(18)8-11-24(23,15(2)25)28-16(3)26/h12-13,18-20H,6-11H2,1-5H3/t18-,19+,20+,22-,23+,24+/m1/s1; Key:RQZAXGRLVPAYTJ-GQFGMJRRSA-N

Megestrol acetate (MGA), sold under the brand name Megace among others, is a progestin medication which is used mainly as an appetite stimulant to treat wasting syndromes such as cachexia. It is also used to treat breast cancer and endometrial cancer, and has been used in birth control. Megestrol acetate is generally formulated alone, although it has been combined with estrogens in birth control formulations. It is usually taken by mouth.

Side effects of megestrol acetate include increased appetite, weight gain, vaginal bleeding, nausea, edema, low sex hormone levels, sexual dysfunction, osteoporosis, cardiovascular complications, glucocorticoid effects, and others. Megestrol acetate is a progestin, or a synthetic progestogen, and hence is an agonist of the progesterone receptor, the biological target of progestogens like progesterone. It has weak partial androgenic activity, weak glucocorticoid activity, and no other important hormonal activity. Due to its progestogenic activity, megestrol acetate has antigonadotropic effects. The mechanism of action of the appetite stimulant effects of megestrol acetate is unknown.

Megestrol acetate was discovered in 1959 and was introduced for medical use, specifically in birth control pills, in 1963. It may be considered a "first-generation" progestin. The medication was withdrawn in some countries in 1970 due to concerns about mammary toxicity observed in dogs, but this turned out not to apply to humans. Megestrol acetate was approved for the treatment of endometrial cancer in 1971 and wasting syndromes in 1993. It is marketed widely throughout the world. It is available as a generic medication.

== Medical uses ==
Megestrol acetate is used mainly as an appetite stimulant to promote weight gain in a variety of situations. When given at very high dosages, it can substantially increase appetite in most individuals, even those with advanced cancer, and is often used to boost appetite and induce weight gain in patients with cancer or HIV/AIDS-associated cachexia. In addition to its effects on appetite, megestrol acetate appears to have antiemetic effects. Megestrol acetate is also used as an antineoplastic agent in the treatment of breast cancer and endometrial cancer. It is significantly inferior to aromatase inhibitors in both clinical effectiveness and tolerability as a second-line therapy for breast cancer after tamoxifen failure. Megestrol acetate was formerly used in combined oral contraceptives in combination with ethinylestradiol or mestranol, and has been used in a combined injectable contraceptive in combination with estradiol as well.

Although it has not been approved for these uses, megestrol acetate has been studied and/or used off-label for a variety of indications including menopausal hormone therapy and the treatment of hot flashes, gynecological/menstrual disorders, endometriosis, endometrial hyperplasia, ovarian cancer, prostate cancer, benign prostatic hyperplasia, male breast cancer, and precocious puberty. Megestrol acetate can also be used to treat pattern hair loss in men, but its side effects generally make it unacceptable for this purpose.

Appetite stimulation is achieved with megestrol acetate with oral dosages of 400 to 800 mg/day. The optimal dosage with maximum effect for appetite stimulation has been determined to be 800 mg/day.

=== Available forms ===
Megestrol acetate is available as 5 mg, 20 mg, and 40 mg oral tablets and in oral suspensions of 40 mg/mL, 125 mg/mL, 625 mg/5 mL, and 820 mg/20 mL. It was used at doses of 1 mg, 2 mg, 4 mg, and 5 mg in combined oral contraceptives. Megestrol acetate is formulated at a dose of 25 mg in combination with a dose of 3.75 mg estradiol in a microcrystalline aqueous suspension for use as a once-monthly combined injectable contraceptive in women.

== Contraindications ==
Contraindications of megestrol acetate include hypersensitivity to megestrol acetate or any component of its formulation, known or suspected pregnancy, and breastfeeding. Megestrol acetate is a teratogen in animals and may have the potential to cause fetal harm, such as decreased fetal weight and feminization of male fetuses.

== Side effects ==
The most common side effect of megestrol acetate is weight gain, with an incidence of 15–70% at the high dosages used to treat breast cancer. Other side effects include vaginal bleeding (7–8%), nausea (7%), and edema (5%), as well as others such as dizziness and shortness of breath. Megestrol acetate can cause hypogonadism and associated symptoms like diminished secondary sexual characteristics, sexual dysfunction, osteoporosis, and reversible infertility in men and premenopausal women. Combining megestrol acetate with an androgen/anabolic steroid like oxandrolone, nandrolone decanoate, or testosterone in men can alleviate megestrol acetate-associated symptoms of hypoandrogenism as well as further increase appetite and weight gain. Less common but more serious side effects of megestrol acetate include cardiovascular/thromboembolic complications such as thrombophlebitis. It may also cause glucocorticoid side effects such as Cushing syndrome-like symptoms, steroid diabetes, and adrenal insufficiency at high dosages. Case reports of deep vein thrombosis, pulmonary embolism, jaundice, intrahepatic cholestasis, and meningiomas in association with high-dosage megestrol acetate have been published. In older patients who take megestrol acetate, one in 23 will have an adverse event leading to death.

== Overdose ==
Megestrol acetate has been studied at very high dosages of as much as 1,600 mg/day with no serious adverse effects observed. No clear increase in rate or severity of side effects have been observed up to 1,600 mg/day megestrol acetate except for weight gain, mild increases in blood pressure, and some fluid retention. In post-marketing experience, limited reports of overdose have been received. Signs and symptoms described in these reports have included diarrhea, nausea, abdominal pain, shortness of breath, cough, unsteady gait, listlessness, and chest pain. There is no specific antidote for overdose of megestrol acetate. Treatment should be supportive and based on symptoms. Megestrol acetate has not been assessed for dialyzability. However, due to its low solubility, it is thought that dialysis would not be useful for treating megestrol acetate overdose.

== Interactions ==
Interactions of megestrol acetate include significantly decreased exposure to indinavir, which may necessitate an increased dosage of the medication. When megestrol acetate is co-administered with zidovudine and rifabutin, there is no significant change in exposure to these medications and no dosage adjustment is necessary.

== Pharmacology ==
=== Pharmacodynamics ===
Megestrol acetate has progestogenic activity, antigonadotropic effects, weak partial androgenic activity, and weak glucocorticoid activity.

Relative affinities (%) of megestrol acetate
Compound	PR	AR	ER	GR	MR	SHBG	CBG
Megestrol acetate	65	5	0	30	0	0	0
Notes: Values are percentages (%). Reference ligands (100%) were promegestone for the PR, metribolone for the AR, estradiol for the ER, dexamethasone for the GR, aldosterone for the MR, dihydrotestosterone for SHBG, and cortisol for CBG. Sources:

==== Progestogenic activity ====
Megestrol acetate is a progestogen, or an agonist of the progesterone receptor (PR). It has about 65% of the affinity of promegestone and 130% of the affinity of progesterone for the progesterone receptor. Like other progestogens, megestrol acetate has functional antiestrogenic effects in certain tissues such as the endometrium and has antigonadotropic effects. The total endometrial transformation dose of megestrol acetate is 50 mg per cycle.

Parenteral potencies and durations of progestogens (Note: Sources:) (Note: All given by intramuscular or subcutaneous injection.)
Compound	Form	Dose for specific uses (mg) (Note: Progesterone production during the luteal phase is ~25 (15–50) mg/day. The OID of OHPC is 250 to 500 mg/month.)			DOA (Note: Duration of action in days.)
Compound	Form	TFD (Note: Usually given for 14 days.)	POICD (Note: Usually dosed every two to three months.)	CICD (Note: Usually dosed once monthly.)	DOA
Algestone acetophenide	Oil soln.	–	–	75–150	14–32 d
Gestonorone caproate	Oil soln.	25–50	–	–	8–13 d
Hydroxyprogest. acetate (Note: Never marketed or approved by this route.)	Aq. susp.	350	–	–	9–16 d
Hydroxyprogest. caproate	Oil soln.	250–500 (Note: In divided doses (2 × 125 or 250 mg for OHPC, 10 × 20 mg for P4).)	–	250–500	5–21 d
Medroxyprog. acetate	Aq. susp.	50–100	150	25	14–50+ d
Megestrol acetate	Aq. susp.	–	–	25	>14 d
Norethisterone enanthate	Oil soln.	100–200	200	50	11–52 d
Progesterone	Oil soln.	200	–	–	2–6 d
Progesterone	Aq. soln.	?	–	–	1–2 d
Progesterone	Aq. susp.	50–200	–	–	7–14 d
Notes and sources:

==== Antigonadotropic and anticorticotropic effects ====
Megestrol acetate has antigonadotropic effects in humans at sufficient doses, capable of profoundly suppressing circulating androgen and estrogen concentrations. The antigonadotropic effects of megestrol acetate are the result of activation of the progesterone receptor, which suppresses the secretion of the gonadotropins—peptide hormones responsible for signaling the body to produce not only progesterone but also the androgens and the estrogens—from the pituitary gland as a form of negative feedback inhibition, and hence downregulates the hypothalamic–pituitary–gonadal axis (HPG axis), resulting in decreased levels of the sex hormones and interference with fertility. As such, megestrol acetate has functional antiandrogenic and antiestrogenic effects as well as contraceptive effects via its antigonadotropic effects.

The precise ovulation-inhibiting dosage of megestrol acetate is unknown. However, doses of 1 to 5 mg megestrol acetate were previously used in combined birth control pills in combination with the estrogen ethinylestradiol or mestranol. Megestrol acetate is an effective contraceptive by itself at dosages of 0.35 to 0.5 mg/day, but is not effective at a dosage of 0.25 mg/day. Megestrol acetate alone does not inhibit ovulation at a dosage of 0.5 mg/day, nor does it fully inhibit ovulation at a dosage of 0.7 mg/day or even at a dosage of 5 mg/day. The combination of 2 to 5 mg/day megestrol acetate and 100 μg/day mestranol has been found to consistently inhibit ovulation, whereas either medication alone did not completely inhibit ovulation in all women.

Suppression of testosterone levels by megestrol acetate is responsible for its effectiveness in the treatment of conditions like prostate cancer and benign prostatic hyperplasia. In one study, 120 to 160 mg/day megestrol acetate suppressed testosterone levels in men by 72%. However, a recovery or "escape" of testosterone levels, gradually returning to near-normal values, has been observed in most men after 2 to 6 months of megestrol acetate therapy, and this has limited the usefulness of the medication. The combination of a lower dosage of megestrol acetate (40–80 mg/day) and a low oral dosage of an estrogen such as estradiol (0.5–1.5 mg/day), diethylstilbestrol (0.1–0.2 mg/day) or ethinylestradiol (50 μg/day) is able to suppress testosterone levels into the castrate range in men, maintain this suppression long-term, and achieve equivalent effectiveness to high-dosage estrogen monotherapy in the treatment of prostate cancer with comparatively greatly reduced toxicity and side effects. In spite of these results, however, this combination has been very rarely used to treat prostate cancer in the United States.

The antigonadotropic as well as anticorticotropic effects of megestrol acetate may be involved in its effectiveness in the treatment of postmenopausal breast cancer via substantially decreasing gonadal and adrenal production of sex steroids and by extension circulating levels of estrogens, by about 80%.

==== Androgenic and antiandrogenic activity ====
Megestrol acetate is a weak partial agonist of the androgen receptor (AR). It has been reported to bind to this receptor with 5% of the affinity of the anabolic steroid metribolone. Despite its weak intrinsic activity at the androgen receptor, at clinical doses in humans, megestrol acetate appears to behave, for all intents and purposes, purely as an antiandrogen. This is based on the fact that no virilizing side effects have been observed with the use of megestrol acetate in patients of either sex at dosages up to as high as 1,600 mg per day, the highest that has been assessed. Furthermore, megestrol acetate produces detectable androgenic effects in animals only at a dose that is the equivalent of approximately 200 times that typically used for the treatment of prostate cancer in men. However, the medication does have moderate androgenic effects on serum lipids in humans, causing a significant reduction of HDL and LDL cholesterol levels and no change in triglyceride levels at a dosage of only 5 mg/day. Conversely, megestrol acetate does not decrease sex hormone-binding globulin levels. The weak but significant androgenic activity of megestrol acetate may serve to limit its clinical effectiveness in the treatment of prostate cancer.

==== Glucocorticoid activity ====
Megestrol acetate is an agonist of the glucocorticoid receptor (GR), the biological target of glucocorticoids like cortisol. It has been found to possess 30% of the affinity of the corticosteroid dexamethasone for this receptor. Megestrol acetate shows the lowest ratio of progesterone receptor affinity to glucocorticoid receptor affinity of a broad selection of marketed progestins, suggesting that it may have among the highest relative glucocorticoid effect of the progestins used in medicine. Megestrol acetate produces observable glucocorticoid effects, with one study finding that, in the dose range tested, it possessed about 50% of the eosinopenic and hyperglycemic activity (markers of glucocorticoid activity) of an equal amount of medroxyprogesterone acetate and about 25% that of hydrocortisone. Accordingly, manifestations of its glucocorticoid activity, including symptoms of Cushing's syndrome, steroid diabetes, and adrenal insufficiency, have been reported with the use of megestrol acetate in the literature, albeit sporadically.

==== Appetite stimulation ====
Megestrol acetate is frequently used as an appetite stimulant to promote weight gain. The direct mechanism of appetite enhancement is unclear, but it is known that megestrol acetate induces a variety of downstream changes to cause the effect, including stimulation of the release of neuropeptide Y in the hypothalamus, neurosteroid-like modulation of calcium channels in the ventromedial hypothalamus, and inhibition of the secretion of proinflammatory cytokines including interleukin 1α, interleukin 1β, interleukin 6, and tumor necrosis factor α, all of which have been implicated in facilitation of appetite. Increased levels of insulin-like growth factor 1 (IGF-1) may also be involved, specifically in its anabolic effects. Studies of megestrol acetate in elderly patients who experience weight loss are limited and of poor quality with most showing minimal or no weight gain, with no nutritional or clinically significant beneficial outcomes observed. In patients who take megestrol acetate, one in 12 will have an increase in weight.

==== Miscellaneous ====
Unlike the case of the androgen receptor, megestrol acetate has no significant affinity for the estrogen receptor. As such, it does not possess the capacity to directly activate the estrogen receptor. Furthermore, unlike antiandrogens such as spironolactone and bicalutamide but similarly to cyproterone acetate, there is relatively little risk of indirectly mediated estrogenic side effects (e.g., gynecomastia) with megestrol acetate. This is because megestrol acetate strongly suppresses both androgen and estrogen levels at the same time. Similarly to the case of the estrogen receptor, megestrol acetate has negligible affinity for the mineralocorticoid receptor (MR), and hence does not possess mineralocorticoid or antimineralocorticoid activity.

Megestrol acetate has been found to dose-dependently increase total and free IGF-1 levels up to a dosage of 120 mg/day. Total IGF-1 levels were described as "profoundly" increased, gradually increasing, significantly by 3 days of treatment, up to a maximum of 2.66-fold by 5 to 6 months of treatment. Free (readily dissociable) concentrations of IGF-1 were increased to a smaller extent, by 1.23–2.15-fold, and were described as increasing "moderately". It was suggested that the increase in IGF-1 levels with high-dosage megestrol acetate therapy may explain the anabolic effects of megestrol acetate in patients with cachexia.

=== Pharmacokinetics ===
The oral bioavailability of megestrol acetate is approximately 100%. After a single low oral dose of 4 mg megestrol acetate, peak serum concentrations of megestrol acetate were about 7 ng/mL (18 nmol/L) and occurred after 3 hours. Following a single high oral dose of 160 mg micronized megestrol acetate in men, peak circulating levels of megestrol acetate were 125 ng/mL (325 nmol/L) and occurred after 6.3 hours. This study found that micronized megestrol acetate at this dose showed considerably improved absorption relative to its conventional tablet form. In terms of plasma protein binding, megestrol acetate is bound mostly to albumin (82.4%) and is not bound to sex hormone-binding globulin or to corticosteroid-binding globulin. Megestrol acetate metabolized in the liver mainly by hydroxylation of the C21, C2α, and C6 positions, as well as by reduction and conjugation. Its elimination half-life is 34 hours on average, with a range of 13 to 105 hours. Megestrol acetate is excreted 57 to 78% in urine and 8 to 30% in feces.

At high doses, megestrol acetate appears to have far greater bioavailability and potency than medroxyprogesterone acetate, regardless of whether the route of administration of the latter is oral or parenteral. Following oral administration of 80 to 160 mg megestrol acetate or 500 to 1,000 mg medroxyprogesterone acetate, circulating levels of megestrol acetate were 2- to 10-fold higher than those of medroxyprogesterone acetate. Similar findings have been found for oral megestrol acetate relative to medroxyprogesterone acetate administered via intramuscular injection. Megestrol acetate also reaches steady-state levels more quickly than medroxyprogesterone acetate. The improved potency of megestrol acetate compared to medroxyprogesterone acetate may be due to increased resistance to metabolism of megestrol acetate afforded by its C6(7) double bond (medroxyprogesterone acetate being identical to megestrol acetate in structure except lacking this feature).

The pharmacokinetics of megestrol acetate have been reviewed.

== Chemistry ==
Megestrol acetate, also known as 17α-acetoxy-6-dehydro-6-methylprogesterone or as 17α-acetoxy-6-methylpregna-4,6-diene-3,20-dione, is a synthetic pregnane steroid and a derivative of progesterone. It is specifically a derivative of 17α-hydroxyprogesterone with a methyl group at the C6 position, a double bond between the C6 and C7 positions, and an acetate ester at the C17α position. Megestrol acetate is the C17α acetate ester of megestrol, which, in contrast to megestrol acetate, was never marketed. Analogues of megestrol acetate include other 17α-hydroxyprogesterone derivatives such as acetomepregenol, anagestone acetate, chlormadinone acetate, cyproterone acetate, hydroxyprogesterone caproate, medroxyprogesterone acetate, and nomegestrol acetate. Megestrol acetate differs from medroxyprogesterone acetate only by its C6(7) double bond. Close analogues of megestrol acetate that were never marketed include cymegesolate (megestrol acetate 3β-cypionate) and megestrol caproate.

=== Synthesis ===
Chemical syntheses of megestrol acetate have been published.

== History ==
Megestrol acetate was synthesized at Syntex in 1959. It was derived from medroxyprogesterone acetate, which had been synthesized at Syntex in 1957. Megestrol acetate was the third synthetic derivative of progesterone to be developed for use as a medication, following hydroxyprogesterone caproate in 1954 and medroxyprogesterone acetate in 1957. The medication was introduced for medical use in combination with ethinylestradiol (EE) as an oral contraceptive in 1963 by British Drug Houses in the United Kingdom under the brand name Volidan (4 mg MGA and 50 μg EE tablets), and this was followed by Serial 28 (1 mg MGA and 100 μg EE tablets) and Volidan 21 (4 mg MGA and 50 μg EE tablets) in 1964 and Nuvacon (2 mg MGA and 100 μg EE tablets) in 1967, all by British Drug Houses also in the United Kingdom. It was also marketed under the brand name Delpregnin (5 mg MGA and 100 μg mestranol tablets) by 1965, among others. Megestrol acetate-containing birth control pills were withdrawn after reports in the early 1970s of a high incidence of venous thromboembolism with the preparations.

In the early 1970s, megestrol acetate was found to be associated with mammary tumors in beagle dogs, and along with several other progestogens, was withdrawn as an oral contraceptive from several markets including the United Kingdom, Canada, and West Germany. It was also under investigation for use as a contraceptive in the United States, but development was discontinued in 1972 following the mammary toxicity findings in dogs, and megestrol acetate was never marketed as an oral contraceptive in the United States. Subsequent research, such as monkey studies, revealed that there is no similar risk in humans. Following its withdrawal from the market, megestrol acetate was eventually reintroduced for the treatment of hormone-sensitive cancers. In addition, megestrol acetate was marketed for veterinary use in dogs in 1969 in the United Kingdom and in 1974 in the United States.

Progesterone was first found to be effective in the treatment of endometrial hyperplasia in 1951, and progestins were first found to be effective in the treatment of endometrial cancer in 1959. Megestrol acetate was reported to be effective in the treatment of endometrial hyperplasia in the mid-1960s. It first started to be studied as a treatment for endometrial cancer in 1967, with findings published in 1973. Megestrol acetate was reportedly introduced for the treatment of endometrial cancer in the United States in 1971. Progesterone was studied in the treatment of breast cancer in 1951 and 1952, but with relatively modest results. Megestrol acetate was first studied in the treatment of breast cancer in 1967, and was one of the first progestins to be evaluated for the treatment of this disease. A second study was conducted in 1974. A "breakthrough" and surge of interest in progestins for breast cancer occurred in 1978 when a study using a massive dosage of medroxyprogesterone acetate to treat breast cancer was published. A third study of megestrol acetate for breast cancer was published in 1980, and this was followed by additional studies in the 1980s and beyond. Megestrol acetate was approved for the treatment of breast cancer in the United States by at least 1983.

Progestogens, including progesterone and ethisterone, were studied in the treatment prostate cancer in 1949. Megestrol acetate was first studied in the treatment of prostate cancer in 1970. Additional studies were conducted in 1975 and 1978, followed by others thereafter. However, results of megestrol acetate therapy for prostate cancer have been "disappointing", and the medication has not been approved for the treatment of prostate cancer in the United States or elsewhere.

Clinical studies of very high dosages of megestrol acetate for breast cancer conducted in the 1980s observed markedly increased appetite and weight gain in treated patients despite them having advanced cancer. This led to potential interest in megestrol acetate as an appetite stimulant, and in 1986, a paper was published proposing the study and potential use of megestrol acetate in cachexia. Megestrol acetate was subsequently studied for this indication and, following completion of phase III clinical trials, was approved as an oral suspension for the treatment of anorexia–cachexia syndrome due to cancer and other chronic conditions such as HIV/AIDS in the United States in 1993. Thereafter, the branded product, Megace ES, has been heavily promoted by its maker, Par Pharmaceutical, for treatment of unintentional weight loss in elderly patients, especially those living in long-term care facilities. In March 2013, Par settled a $45 million federal and multi-state criminal and civil lawsuit in which the company was accused of promoting the branded version of megestrol acetate, over the generic version, for use in treating non-AIDS-related geriatric wasting. This use was not approved as safe and effective by the Food and Drug Administration (FDA), and not covered by federal health care programs. The lawsuit claimed that Par marketed the product as effective for this use, despite having conducted no well-controlled studies to support a claim of greater efficacy for Megace ES, and prior knowledge of the severe adverse side effects for geriatric patients, including deep vein thrombosis, toxic reactions with impaired renal function, and mortality.

== Society and culture ==
=== Generic names ===
Megestrol acetate is the generic name of the drug and its INNM, USAN, USP, and BANM, while megestrol is the INN and BAN and mégestrol the DCF of megestrol, the free alcohol form of megestrol acetate. The medication is also known by its developmental code names BDH-1298, NSC-71423, and SC-10363.

=== Brand names ===
Megestrol acetate is marketed under a variety of brand names throughout the world but is most commonly sold under the brand name Megace. It is also available under the brand name Megace ES in the United States and under the brand name Megace OS in Canada. For use in veterinary medicine, megestrol acetate is sold as Ovaban in the United States and as Ovarid in the United Kingdom.

In Bangladesh and India, megestrol is marketed under the brand name Megestol by Ziska Pharmaceuticals, Mezest by Beacon Pharmaceuticals, and under the trade name Varigestrol by Laboratorio Varifarma, Argentina.

=== Availability ===
Megestrol acetate is available widely throughout the world, including in the United States, Canada, the United Kingdom, Ireland, elsewhere throughout Europe, Australia, New Zealand, Latin America, Asia, and a few African countries.

=== Generation ===
Progestins in birth control pills are sometimes grouped by generation. While the 19-nortestosterone progestins are consistently grouped into generations, the pregnane progestins that are or have been used in birth control pills are typically omitted from such classifications or are grouped simply as "miscellaneous" or "pregnanes". In any case, based on its date of introduction in such formulations of 1963, megestrol acetate could be considered a "first-generation" progestin.

== Research ==
Megestrol acetate has been studied in men in combination with testosterone as a male hormonal contraceptive to suppress spermatogenesis.

== Veterinary use ==
Megestrol acetate has been used in veterinary medicine under the brand name Ovaban in the treatment of medical conditions in cats and dogs. Due to its ability to suppress testosterone levels, megestrol acetate can control sexually dimorphic traits in males. As a result, megestrol acetate has been used to reduce dominance, inter-male aggression, mounting, urine spraying, and roaming in male dogs and cats. Megestrol acetate is not recommended as an appetite stimulant in cats and dogs. Megestrol acetate can cause diabetes mellitus and mammary adenocarcinoma in cats.

== See also ==
- Estradiol/megestrol acetate
- Ethinylestradiol/megestrol acetate
