= Megestrol =

Chemical compound

Clinical data
- ATC code: G03AC05

Identifiers
- IUPAC name: 17-hydroxy-6-methylpregna-4,6-diene-3,20-dione
- CAS Number: 3562-63-8
- PubChem CID: 1909019090
- DrugBank: DB19378
- ChemSpider: 18023
- UNII: EA6LD1M70M
- ChEBI: CHEBI:6722
- CompTox Dashboard (EPA): DTXSID001009330
- ECHA InfoCard: 100.020.571

Chemical and physical data
- Formula: C_{22}H_{30}O_{3}
- Molar mass: 342.479 g·mol^{−1}
- 3D model (JSmol): Interactive image
- SMILES: O=C4\C=C3\C(=C/[C@@H]1[C@H](CC[C@@]2([C@@](O)(C(=O)C)CC[C@@H]12)C)[C@@]3(C)CC4)C
- InChI: InChI=1S/C22H30O3/c1-13-11-16-17(20(3)8-5-15(24)12-19(13)20)6-9-21(4)18(16)7-10-22(21,25)14(2)23/h11-12,16-18,25H,5-10H2,1-4H3/t16-,17+,18+,20-,21+,22+/m1/s1; Key:VXIMPSPISRVBPZ-NWUMPJBXSA-N

Megestrol (INN, BAN) is a progestin of the 17α-hydroxyprogesterone group which was, until recently, never marketed or used clinically. It is now used for treatments of disease-related weight loss, endometrial cancer, and breast cancer. Its acylated derivative megestrol acetate is also a progestogen, which, in contrast to megestrol itself, has been extensively used as a pharmaceutical drug.

== Medical use ==
As of June 2023, megestrol is being used to treat significant weight loss in HIV/AIDS patients, and as a palliative treatment of endometrial and breast cancers. It can be administered in both tablet and oral suspension forms, with dosages ranging from 100 mg/day to 1600 mg/day depending on the condition being treated.

== Synthesis ==
Megestrol can be synthesized from 6a-methylprogesterone.

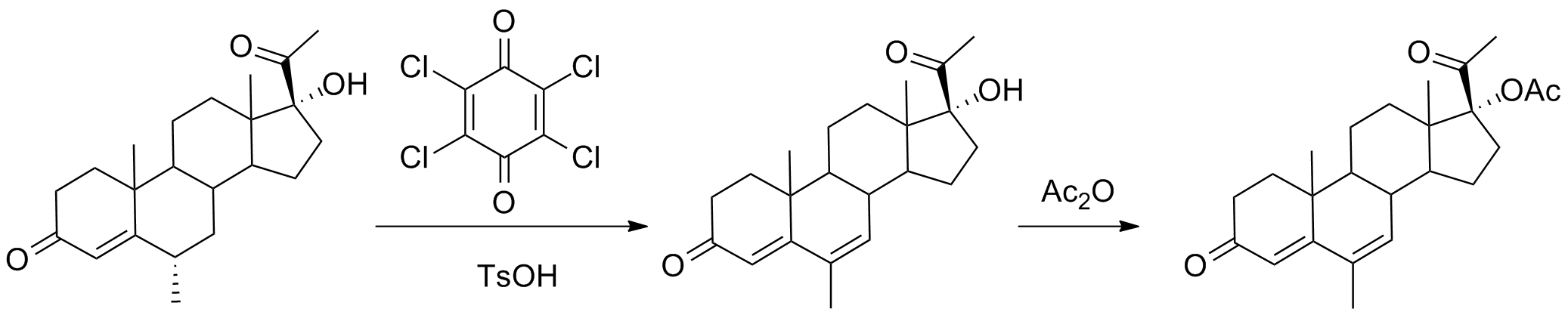
Megestrol synthesis

== See also ==
- Medroxyprogesterone
- Medroxyprogesterone acetate
