= Ethinylestradiol/megestrol acetate =

Combination drug

- Ethinylestradiol

- Megestrol acetate

Combination of
- Ethinylestradiol: Estrogen
- Megestrol acetate: Progestogen; Progestin

Clinical data
- Trade names: Nuvacon, Volidan
- Other names: EE/MGA
- Routes of administration: By mouth
- Drug class: Estrogen; Progestin; Progestogen

Legal status
- Legal status: US: ℞-only

Identifiers
- CAS Number: 8064-66-2
- PubChem CID: 66446

Ethinylestradiol/megestrol acetate (EE/MGA), sold under the brand name Volidan among others, was a combination of ethinylestradiol (EE), an estrogen, and megestrol acetate (MGA), a progestin, which was used as a birth control pill to prevent pregnancy in women. It was taken by mouth and contained 50 to 100 μg EE and 1 to 5 mg MGA per tablet. MGA-containing birth control pills were withdrawn after reports in the early 1970s of a high incidence of venous thromboembolism in association with the preparation.

== See also ==
- List of combined sex-hormonal preparations § Estrogens and progestogens
