= Medroxyprogesterone =

Steroidal progestin drug

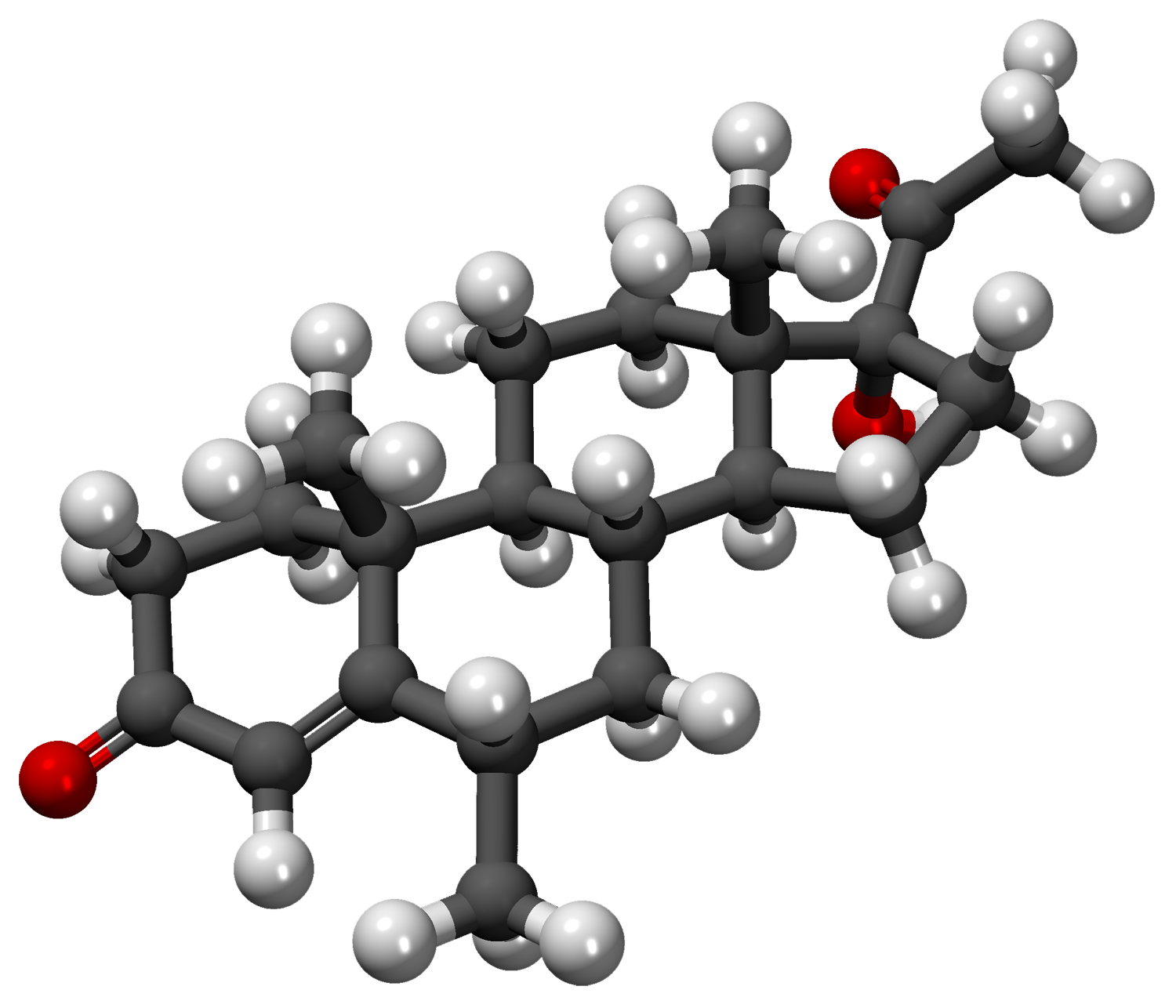

Clinical data
- Other names: MP; Methylhydroxyprogesterone; 6α-Methyl-17α-hydroxyprogesterone; 6α-Methyl-17α-hydroxypregn-4-en-3,20-dione
- Drug class: Progestin; Progestogen
- ATC code: None

Identifiers
- IUPAC name: (6S,8R,9S,10R,13S,14S,17R)-17-acetyl-17-hydroxy-6,10,13-trimethyl-2,6,7,8,9,11,12,14,15,16-decahydro-1H-cyclopenta[a]phenanthren-3-one
- CAS Number: 520-85-4
- PubChem CID: 10631
- ChemSpider: 10185
- UNII: HSU1C9YRES
- CompTox Dashboard (EPA): DTXSID0036508
- ECHA InfoCard: 100.007.545

Chemical and physical data
- Formula: C_{22}H_{32}O_{3}
- Molar mass: 344.495 g·mol^{−1}
- 3D model (JSmol): Interactive image
- SMILES: O=C4\C=C2/[C@]([C@H]1CC[C@@]3([C@@](O)(C(=O)C)CC[C@H]3[C@@H]1C[C@@H]2C)C)(C)CC4
- InChI: InChI=1S/C22H32O3/c1-13-11-16-17(20(3)8-5-15(24)12-19(13)20)6-9-21(4)18(16)7-10-22(21,25)14(2)23/h12-13,16-18,25H,5-11H2,1-4H3/t13-,16+,17-,18-,20+,21-,22-/m0/s1; Key:FRQMUZJSZHZSGN-HBNHAYAOSA-N

Medroxyprogesterone (MP), is a progestin which is not used medically. A derivative, medroxyprogesterone acetate (MPA), is used as a medication in humans, and is far more widely known in comparison. Medroxyprogesterone is sometimes used as a synonym for medroxyprogesterone acetate, and what is almost always being referred to when the term is used is MPA and not medroxyprogesterone.

== Pharmacology ==
=== Pharmacodynamics ===
Compared to MPA, medroxyprogesterone is over two orders of magnitude less potent as a progestogen. Medroxyprogesterone is also notable in that it is a minor metabolite of MPA. In addition to its progestagenic activity, medroxyprogesterone is a weak antiandrogen in vitro on human androgen receptor.

MP and related steroids at the PR (nM)
Compound	K_{i}	EC_{50}^{a}	EC_{50}^{b}
Progesterone	4.3	0.9	25
Medroxyprogesterone	241	47	32
Medroxyprogesterone acetate	1.2	0.6	0.15
Values are nM. ^{a} = Coactivator recruitment. ^{b} = Reporter cell line.

== Chemistry ==
Medroxyprogesterone, also known as 6α-methyl-17α-hydroxyprogesterone or as 6α-methyl-17α-hydroxypregn-4-en-3,20-dione, is a synthetic pregnane steroid and a derivative of progesterone. It is specifically a derivative of 17α-hydroxyprogesterone with a methyl group at the C6α position. The generic name of medroxyprogesterone is a contraction of 6α-methyl-17α-hydroxyprogesterone. It is closely related to medrogestone as well as other unesterified 17α-hydroxyprogesterone derivatives such as chlormadinone, cyproterone, and megestrol.

== Society and culture ==
=== Generic names ===
Medroxyprogesterone is the generic name of the drug and its INN and BAN.

Brand Name

Meprate 10 Tablets (practo)
