= Micronization =

Reduction of average diameter of a solid's particles

Micronization is the process of reducing the average diameter of the particles of a solid material, typically into the micrometre range and in some cases the nanometre range. It is a form of comminution and is a critical unit operation in the manufacture of active pharmaceutical ingredients, food ingredients, pigments, agrochemicals and other fine chemicals where dissolution rate, content uniformity or aerosol behaviour depend on particle size.

Industrial micronization is carried out by several distinct technology families. Mechanical comminution methods — particularly air-jet milling and cryogenic milling — dominate commercial pharmaceutical production and operate under current good manufacturing practice regulations such as ICH Q7. For sub-micron particles required by poorly water-soluble drugs, wet bead milling, high-pressure homogenization and dry co-milling produce nanocrystalline suspensions and powders. Supercritical fluid precipitation methods, including RESS, SAS and PGSS, offer finer morphological control for thermolabile compounds.

The principal rationale for micronization in pharmaceutical applications is the inverse relationship between particle diameter and surface area in the Noyes–Whitney equation: reducing particle size accelerates dissolution and, for poorly soluble drugs in BCS Class II and IV, can substantially improve bioavailability. Other major applications include dry powder and metered-dose inhaler formulations, where aerodynamic diameter in the 1–5 μm range is required for lung deposition. Particle size after micronization is most commonly measured by laser diffraction under USP general chapter <429> and the harmonized ISO 13320 standard, and reported as the volume-weighted D10, D50 and D90 statistics.

High-energy mechanical micronization can introduce surface amorphization, polymorphic conversion and triboelectric charging, all of which affect downstream stability and processability and often require post-milling conditioning to control.

== Mechanics of Micronization ==
The size reduction achieved by mechanical micronization depends on both the mill and the material being ground. The breakage behaviour of a material can be characterised by material parameters derived from single-particle impact tests, which quantify a particle's resistance to fracture and the minimum specific energy it can absorb without breaking; these allow the breakage probability of different materials to be described by a common master curve.

== Mechanical comminution ==
Mechanical comminution is the dominant family of techniques for industrial micronization. The process typically begins with coarse size reduction — crushing by hammer or impact mills and cutting by blade mills — which produces feed material in the millimetre-to-coarse-micrometre range from bulk solids. Conventional tumbling ball mills, in which a rotating drum loaded with steel or ceramic grinding media reduces the feed by impact and abrasion, are widely used for grinding in the 50–500 μm range but do not typically achieve micrometre-scale particle sizes on their own. True micronization to the 1–10 μm range is achieved by higher-energy mechanical techniques, principally jet milling for dry powders and wet bead milling or high-pressure homogenization for aqueous suspensions, which are described in the following sections.

Industrial pharmaceutical micronization is dominated by mechanical comminution methods, particularly air-jet milling (also called fluid energy milling) and cryogenic milling. These mechanical methods scale from gram-level development batches to multi-metric-ton commercial campaigns and operate under current good manufacturing practice (cGMP) regulations such as 21 CFR Part 211 and ICH Q7.

The choice of micronization technology depends on the active pharmaceutical ingredient's physical properties. Air-jet milling produces narrow, log-normal particle-size distributions typically with D50 below 5 µm and span ≤ 2, and is the standard approach for dry powder inhalation products and poorly soluble oral solids. Cryogenic milling is used for heat-sensitive and elastic compounds where ambient-temperature jet milling would cause thermal degradation or insufficient particle breakage.

=== Jet milling ===
Jet milling (also called fluid energy milling) is the most widely used industrial technique for micronizing active pharmaceutical ingredients and similar fine chemicals. Unlike ball or media mills, jet mills contain no moving grinding bodies; particle size reduction is achieved by high-velocity particle–particle collisions in a stream of compressed gas, typically nitrogen or dry air.

In a fluid energy (jet) mill, particles are entrained in one or more high-velocity gas streams and size reduction occurs primarily through collisions between the particles themselves rather than impact with the mill walls, which minimises contamination; the cooling produced by expansion of the compressed gas also permits the milling of heat-sensitive materials. Spiral jet mills, which have no moving parts, are widely used to micronize pharmaceutical substances to narrow size distributions in the low-micrometre range.

The most common configuration is the spiral jet mill (also called a pancake or loop mill), in which feed material is introduced into a flat cylindrical chamber through a Venturi and accelerated by tangential gas jets. Coarse particles are retained near the chamber wall by centrifugal force and continue to be ground, while fines exit through a central classifier outlet. Spiral jet mills routinely achieve volume median diameters (D50) of 1–10 μm without product contact with mechanical grinding surfaces, making the technology attractive for high-purity and abrasion-sensitive materials.

The principal process parameters are grinding gas pressure, feed rate, and the ratio between them; increasing pressure or decreasing feed rate generally shifts the particle size distribution finer. Because the expanding gas cools as it leaves the nozzles, jet milling imparts much less thermal stress than mechanical mills, allowing micronization of thermolabile and low-melting actives. However, the high specific energy input can induce surface amorphization, lattice strain, and changes in surface energy that affect downstream processability and stability.

For highly potent compounds — such as steroidal hormones, cytotoxic oncology actives, and antibody–drug conjugate payloads — jet mills are operated inside containment isolators meeting occupational exposure limits in the nanogram-per-cubic-metre range. Methods like crushing and cutting are also used for reducing particle diameter, but produce more rough particles compared to the two previous techniques (and are therefore the early stages of the micronization process). Crushing employs hammer-like tools to break the solid into smaller particles by means of impact. Cutting uses sharp blades to cut the rough solid pieces into smaller ones.

In pharmaceutical jet milling, the specific energy (energy input per unit mass of feed) is the principal factor governing the resulting particle size and is used as the basis for scaling the process from laboratory to commercial manufacture.

=== Wet media milling (nanocrystal technology) ===
In wet media milling, the drug substance is suspended in an aqueous solution containing a stabilizing surfactant or polymer and circulated through a chamber filled with small (typically 0.2–0.5 mm) ceramic, glass, or polymer-coated beads. Bead-on-bead and bead-on-particle impacts progressively reduce the drug particle size to the 100–400 nm range, while the stabilizer adsorbs onto newly created surfaces and prevents agglomeration.

The technology, commercialized as NanoCrystal by Elan Drug Technologies (later Alkermes), underpins several U.S. Food and Drug Administration–approved products, including sirolimus (Rapamune oral tablet, approved 2000), aprepitant (Emend, 2003), fenofibrate (Tricor 145 mg, 2004; Triglide, 2005), and megestrol acetate (Megace ES, 2005).

=== High-pressure homogenization ===
In high-pressure homogenization (HPH), a coarse drug suspension is forced at pressures of 100–2000 bar through a narrow gap (typically a few micrometres wide), where particles are disintegrated by cavitation, shear, and particle–particle collisions. The technique can be operated in water (DissoCubes platform) or in non-aqueous or water-reduced media (Nanopure platform), the latter being useful for hydrolytically unstable compounds.

Unlike dry jet milling, both wet milling and HPH yield aqueous nanosuspensions that can be dosed directly as liquids or converted to solid dosage forms by spray drying, freeze drying, or granulation. Both technologies are scalable to commercial volumes and are compatible with cGMP aseptic processing for parenteral products.

=== Dry co-micronization ===
Dry co-micronization is a nanomilling approach in which the drug substance is milled in a dry state together with GRAS excipients in a single unit operation. The excipients form a protective dispersion matrix around the sub-micron drug particles, preventing the surface-energy-driven reaggregation that otherwise dominates dry submicron powders, and yielding a free-flowing powder that can be tableted or encapsulated without further drying or downstream processing.

The most widely commercialized dry co-micronization platform is SoluMatrix Fine Particle Technology, developed by iCeutica and acquired in 2011 by Iroko Pharmaceuticals. The platform has been used to formulate three U.S. Food and Drug Administration–approved low-dose non-steroidal anti-inflammatory drugs: Zorvolex (diclofenac, approved October 2013), Tivorbex (indomethacin, approved February 2014), and Vivlodex (meloxicam, approved October 2015). Each product was approved at a total daily dose 20–35% below the equivalent conventionally-formulated NSAID, on the basis that the increased dissolution rate of sub-micron particles permits comparable analgesic efficacy at lower systemic exposure.

Unlike wet media milling, dry co-micronization requires no aqueous suspension or downstream drying step, shortening the unit-operation chain at the cost of constraining the formulation to excipients compatible with high-energy dry impact.

== Supercritical fluid methods ==
Supercritical fluid precipitation techniques produce micronized particles by inducing supersaturation in a supercritical-fluid solution, leading to controlled precipitation of individual particles. The three most widely applied variants are the RESS process (Rapid Expansion of Supercritical Solutions), the SAS method (Supercritical Anti-Solvent) and the PGSS method (Particles from Gas Saturated Solutions), each described in the subsections below.

Supercritical carbon dioxide (scCO_{2}) is the most commonly used medium because it is chemically inert, has easily accessible critical-point parameters, and can be used to obtain either crystalline or amorphous micronized forms.

Particle size and morphology are controlled both by macroscopic parameters such as nozzle geometry and flow rate, and by molecular-level effects of pressure, temperature, solute concentration and antisolvent-to-solvent ratio. These conditions influence nucleation kinetics and can drive polymorphic or amorphous transformations during particle formation.

Compared to mechanical comminution, supercritical-fluid methods generally yield narrower particle-size distributions and more consistent particle morphology, and the relatively mild operating pressures and temperatures permit processing of thermolabile compounds. The use of CO_{2} as solvent also avoids the flammable and toxic organic solvents required by some conventional precipitation methods.

=== RESS ===
In the case of RESS (Rapid Expansion of Supercritical Solutions), the supercritical fluid is used to dissolve the solid material under high pressure and temperature, thus forming a homogeneous supercritical phase. Thereafter, the mixture is expanded through a nozzle to form the smaller particles. Immediately upon exiting the nozzle, rapid expansion occurs, lowering the pressure. The pressure will drop below supercritical pressure, causing the supercritical fluid—usually carbon dioxide—to return to the gas state. This phase change severely decreases the solubility of the mixture and results in precipitation of particles. The less time it takes the solution to expand and the solute to precipitate, the narrower the particle size distribution will be. Faster precipitation times also tend to result in smaller particle diameters.

=== SAS ===
In the SAS method (Supercritical Anti-Solvent), the solid material is dissolved in an organic solvent. The supercritical fluid is then added as an antisolvent, which decreases the solubility of the system. As a result, particles of small diameter are formed. There are various submethods to SAS which differ in the method of introduction of the supercritical fluid into the organic solution.

=== PGSS ===
In the PGSS method (Particles from Gas Saturated Solutions) the solid material is melted and the supercritical fluid is dissolved in it. However, in this case the solution is forced to expand through a nozzle, and in this way nanoparticles are formed. The PGSS method has the advantage that because of the supercritical fluid, the melting point of the solid material is reduced. Therefore, the solid melts at a lower temperature than the normal melting temperature at ambient pressure.

== Rationale: dissolution rate and bioavailability ==
The primary motivation for micronizing pharmaceutical solids is to accelerate their dissolution in biological fluids. For a drug administered as a solid dosage form, bioavailability depends on the rate at which solid drug dissolves in the gastrointestinal tract relative to the rate at which the dissolved drug permeates intestinal membranes.

The Noyes–Whitney equation, formulated in 1897, expresses dissolution rate as

$$\frac{dm}{dt} = \frac{D \cdot A \cdot (C_s - C)}{h}$$

where dm/dt is the mass dissolution rate, D the diffusion coefficient, A the surface area of solid in contact with the dissolution medium, C_{s} the saturation solubility, C the bulk concentration, and h the thickness of the unstirred diffusion layer. Because A scales inversely with particle diameter, reducing median diameter from approximately 50 μm to 5 μm increases the available surface area roughly ten-fold and produces a corresponding increase in dissolution rate at constant solubility. At sub-micron diameters, C_{s} itself increases according to the Ostwald–Freundlich equation, providing an additional thermodynamic contribution to dissolution.

Under the Biopharmaceutics Classification System (BCS), drugs are categorized by aqueous solubility and intestinal permeability. Micronization confers the greatest clinical benefit for BCS Class II compounds (low solubility, high permeability), where dissolution rate — not membrane permeation — limits absorption. For BCS Class III and IV compounds, in which permeability is the rate-limiting step, particle size reduction alone produces little change in bioavailability and must be combined with permeation enhancers or alternative delivery strategies.

== Limitations of mechanical micronization ==
Although mechanical micronization is the most widely used industrial technique, the high specific energy delivered by milling can alter the solid-state properties of the active beyond simple size reduction. The most extensively documented consequence is partial conversion of crystalline material to the amorphous state at the newly created particle surfaces. Because the amorphous state has higher free energy, greater hygroscopicity, and faster dissolution than the parent crystal, surface amorphization can shift dissolution behaviour, accelerate moisture uptake, and recrystallize uncontrollably during storage — altering the very properties micronization was performed to achieve.

Mechanical stress can also drive polymorphic conversion between crystalline forms or induce conversion from anhydrous to hydrated phases (and vice versa). The thermodynamic driving force is provided by the cumulative mechanical energy absorbed by the lattice; in some cases the milled product passes through an amorphous intermediate before recrystallizing into a different polymorph than the starting material. Because different polymorphs and hydrates have different solubility, dissolution rate, and bioavailability, mill-induced polymorphic conversion is a critical quality attribute that must be monitored by techniques such as X-ray powder diffraction, differential scanning calorimetry, and Raman spectroscopy.

A separate consequence is that the freshly milled particles carry high surface energy and acquire substantial triboelectric charge by repeated particle–wall and particle–particle contact during milling and downstream handling. The resulting electrostatic forces drive agglomeration, complicate blending uniformity, and — in dry powder inhaler formulations — cause drift in fine-particle fraction during storage as the powder relaxes toward thermodynamic equilibrium. To mitigate these effects, micronized actives intended for high-sensitivity applications are commonly subjected to a post-milling conditioning step, in which the powder is exposed to controlled humidity or a solvent vapour for hours to days to allow surface relaxation, partial recrystallization, and reduction of stored mechanical energy before formulation.

Mechanical micronization is generally unsuitable for biologic APIs such as proteins, because the high-energy stresses of jet milling can cause denaturation; spray drying with stabilizing excipients is the route typically used to produce inhalable dry powders of biologics.

== Particle size characterization ==
Because micronized powders are heterogeneous in both size and shape, "particle size" is defined operationally as an equivalent spherical diameter — the diameter of a sphere that would produce the same response in a given measurement technique. Different techniques therefore yield different equivalent diameters for the same powder, and a complete specification typically reports both the measurement method and the statistical descriptors of the distribution.

The dominant technique for pharmaceutical micronization is laser diffraction, standardized internationally by ISO 13320 and harmonized in the United States Pharmacopeia general chapter <429> Light Diffraction Measurement of Particle Size and equivalent texts in the European Pharmacopoeia and Japanese Pharmacopoeia. Laser diffraction measures the angular intensity pattern produced when a dilute particle dispersion is illuminated by a coherent light source, and applies either Mie or Fraunhofer optical theory to invert the pattern into a volume-weighted size distribution. The method is applicable from approximately 0.1 μm to 3 mm, covers the entire size range of pharmaceutical micronization, and is non-destructive and fast.

The distribution is most commonly summarized by the volume-weighted D-statistics: D10, D50 (the volume median diameter, equal to the mass median diameter for particles of uniform density), and D90, denoting the diameters below which 10%, 50%, and 90% of the cumulative particle volume lies. A derived parameter, the span — defined as (D90 − D10) / D50 — quantifies the width of the distribution; micronized active pharmaceutical ingredients used in dry powder inhaler formulations typically target a D50 of 1–5 μm and a span of approximately 1–2.

Laser diffraction is often paired with complementary techniques chosen for the property under control: dynamic image analysis and scanning electron microscopy for particle shape and surface morphology; Brunauer–Emmett–Teller gas-adsorption measurement for specific surface area, which scales inversely with effective particle diameter and is more sensitive to the finest fraction than volume-weighted methods; and dynamic light scattering or sedimentation field-flow fractionation for sub-micron and nanoparticle fractions outside the lower limit of laser diffraction.

== Applications ==
=== Inhalation drug products ===
In pharmaceutical dry powder manufacturing, jet milling and spray drying are the two established particle-engineering technologies; jet milling is a top-down comminution method, whereas spray drying is a bottom-up process that atomizes an API solution or suspension into droplets that are rapidly dried into solid particles. Emerging alternatives such as spray-freeze drying, thin-film freezing and supercritical-assisted spray drying have been explored for micronization but are not widely implemented and have limited scale-up capability.

Micronization is essential to nearly all marketed inhalation therapies, including dry powder inhalers (DPIs), metered-dose inhalers (MDIs) and nebulized suspensions. Drug deposition in the lung is governed by the aerodynamic diameter of the inhaled particles: particles larger than approximately 5 μm impact in the oropharynx and upper airways, while particles smaller than approximately 1 μm are largely exhaled. The 1–5 μm range, often termed the "respirable fraction," deposits in the conducting airways and alveolar region by sedimentation and diffusion.

To achieve this size range with the narrow distribution required for reproducible lung dose, inhalation actives — including corticosteroids such as fluticasone propionate and budesonide, β_{2}-agonists such as salbutamol (albuterol) and salmeterol, and anticholinergics such as tiotropium bromide — are routinely micronized by spiral jet milling. In DPI formulations the micronized active is then blended with larger (typically 50–200 μm) carrier particles, most commonly α-lactose monohydrate, from which the drug detaches on inhalation.

The high surface energy and amorphous content generated by jet milling can cause inhalation powders to cohere or to recrystallize on storage, altering aerosol performance over time. Manufacturers therefore typically condition micronized inhalation actives for example by controlled exposure to humidity or solvent vapour to relax surface disorder before formulation.

Carrier-based dry powder inhaler formulations require an API with a stable crystalline structure that can withstand the stress of milling, whereas spray drying can yield amorphous particles with faster dissolution than crystalline micronized forms.

=== Other ===
Progesterone is a notable example. Because progesterone is poorly water-soluble and has limited absorption from the gastrointestinal tract in its native crystalline form, micronization to particle diameters of approximately 5–10 μm substantially increases its oral bioavailability. Micronized progesterone is the active ingredient in the U.S. Food and Drug Administration–approved product Prometrium, indicated for use in hormone replacement therapy in postmenopausal women receiving conjugated estrogens and for the treatment of secondary amenorrhea.
