= Steroid-induced diabetes =

- Other names: Steroid diabetes
- Specialty: Endocrinology

Steroid-induced diabetes is characterized as an unusual rise in blood sugar that is linked to the use of glucocorticoids in a patient who may or may not have had diabetes in the past.

== Causes ==
Steroid diabetes is caused by the use of glucocorticoids.

=== Risk factors ===
Traditional risk factors for type 2 diabetes, such as advanced age, a family history of the disease, a high body mass index, and impaired glucose tolerance, are also suggested risk factors for steroid-induced diabetes, in addition to cumulative dosage and length of steroid course.

Glycemic control can be impacted by other immunosuppressive medications through different mechanisms, which could complicate the effects of glucocorticoid therapy. By inhibiting the production of insulin, calcineurin inhibitors, especially tacrolimus, are used in transplant patients, which increases their risk of developing glucose intolerance. Diabetes was linked to the concurrent use of mycophenalate mofetil in patients with lupus receiving high-dose steroid therapy; this could be explained by decreased insulin secretion due to elevated beta cell stress.

There is an inverse correlation between serum magnesium levels and glycemic control, according to several studies.

Although chronic hepatitis C virus (HCV) infection is thought to be a separate risk factor for the development of diabetes in both the general population and liver transplant recipients, liver disease is known to exacerbate impaired glucose tolerance.

== Diagnosis ==
The American Diabetes Association defines the following criteria for the diagnosis of diabetes: a HbA1c of 6.5%, an 8-hour fasting blood glucose of 7.0 mmol/L (126 mg/dL), a 2-hour oral glucose tolerance test (OGTT) of ≥ 11.1 mmol/L (200 mg/dL), or in patients exhibiting hyperglycemic symptoms, a random plasma glucose of ≥ 11.1 mmol/L (200 mg/dL).

== Treatment ==
Like with all forms of diabetes, lifestyle modification, including exercise and dietary counseling to offer options that might lessen postprandial hyperglycemia, is the first step toward improving glycemic control.

Current guidelines may not adequately address this because the initiation of glucocorticoids can result in postprandial hyperglycemia and the tapering of glucocorticoids can normalize glycemic control. The most accommodating option for patients is still basal bolus insulin therapy, which consists of three parts: basal insulin, prandial insulin, and supplemental correction factor insulin.
