= Dimepregnen =

Chemical compound

Clinical data
- ATC code: None

Identifiers
- IUPAC name: (3β,6α,16α)-3-Hydroxy-6,16-dimethylpregn-4-en-20-one
- CAS Number: 21208-26-4
- PubChem CID: 208839
- ChemSpider: 180948
- UNII: X08N6BOT8Y
- CompTox Dashboard (EPA): DTXSID301016881

Chemical and physical data
- Formula: C_{23}H_{36}O_{2}
- Molar mass: 344.539 g·mol^{−1}
- 3D model (JSmol): Interactive image
- SMILES: CC1CC2C3CC(C4=CC(CCC4(C3CCC2(C1C(=O)C)C)C)O)C
- InChI: InChI=InChI=1S/C23H36O2/c1-13-10-17-18(22(4)8-6-16(25)12-19(13)22)7-9-23(5)20(17)11-14(2)21(23)15(3)24/h12-14,16-18,20-21,25H,6-11H2,1-5H3/t13-,14+,16-,17+,18-,20-,21+,22+,23-/m0/s1; Key:ATEJLEVEJWUXMA-XGYZZIOMSA-N

Dimepregnen (INN, BAN) (developmental code name ST-1411), or 6α,16α-dimethylpregn-4-en-3β-ol-20-one, is a pregnene steroid described as an antiestrogen that was synthesized in 1968 and was never marketed. It is similar in structure to the progestins and progesterone derivatives melengestrol and anagestone.

== See also ==
- Anagestone acetate
- Medroxyprogesterone acetate
- Megestrol acetate
- Melengestrol acetate
