= Ethynerone =

Chemical compound

Clinical data
- Routes of administration: Oral

Identifiers
- IUPAC name: (8S,13S,14S,17S)-17-(2-Chloroethynyl)-17-hydroxy-13-methyl-1,2,6,7,8,11,12,14,15,16-decahydrocyclopenta[a]phenanthren-3-one
- CAS Number: 3124-93-4
- PubChem CID: 18403
- ChemSpider: 8512249
- UNII: CKM4S0R7LX
- CompTox Dashboard (EPA): DTXSID10185170

Chemical and physical data
- Formula: C_{20}H_{23}ClO_{2}
- Molar mass: 330.85 g·mol^{−1}
- 3D model (JSmol): Interactive image
- SMILES: CC12CCC3=C4CCC(=O)C=C4CCC3C1CCC2(C#CCl)O
- InChI: InChI=1S/C20H23ClO2/c1-19-8-6-16-15-5-3-14(22)12-13(15)2-4-17(16)18(19)7-9-20(19,23)10-11-21/h12,17-18,23H,2-9H2,1H3/t17-,18+,19+,20-/m1/s1; Key:KEOBKPHJNAILCW-FUMNGEBKSA-N

Ethynerone (INN, USAN), also known as 17α-(2-chloroethynyl)estra-4,9-dien-17β-ol-3-one, is a steroidal progestin of the 19-nortestosterone group that was first reported in 1961 but was never marketed. Under the developmental code name MK-665, it was studied in combination with mestranol as an oral contraceptive. Development of the drug was discontinued due to concerns surrounding toxicity findings in dogs. It is a chloroethynylated derivative of norethisterone.

In 1966, during its clinical development, ethynerone was found to produce mammary gland tumors in dogs treated with it at very high doses for prolonged periods of time. Subsequent investigation found that 17α-hydroxyprogesterone derivatives included anagestone acetate, chlormadinone acetate, medroxyprogesterone acetate, and megestrol acetate produced similar mammary gland tumors, and that their ability to do so correlated directly with their progestogenic actions. In contrast, the non-halogenated 19-nortestosterone derivatives norgestrel, norethisterone, noretynodrel, and etynodiol diacetate, which are much less potent as progestogens, did not produce such effects at the dosages tested. Clinical development of ethynerone was discontinued, and many of the 17α-hydroxyprogesterone derivatives were withdrawn for the indication of hormonal contraception. Research later on revealed species differences between dogs and humans and established that there is no similar risk in humans.

Mammary tumors in beagle dogs treated by (left) MK-665 (ethynerone with mestranol) and (right) chloroethynylnorgestrel with mestranol for 4 years at a dosage of 1.05 mg/kg/day cyclically.

== Synthesis ==
Ethynerone synthesis. J. Fried and T. S. Bry U.S. patent 3,096,353 (1963, Merck & Co. Inc).

== See also ==
- Chloroethynylnorgestrel
