= C22H34O2 =

The molecular formula C_{22}H_{34}O_{2} (molar mass: 330.51 g/mol, exact mass: 330.2559 u) may refer to:

- Anagestone
- Docosapentaenoic acid
- E-EPA
- Hexahydrocannabihexol
- 3β-Methoxypregnenolone
- Topterone
