= C23H36O2 =

The molecular formula C_{23}H_{36}O_{2} (molar mass: 344.53 g/mol, exact mass: 344.2715 u) may refer to:

- Cardanolide
- Dimepregnen, or 6α,16α-dimethylpregn-4-en-3β-ol-20-one
- Hexahydrocannabiphorol
- Luteone (terpenoid)
