= Chlormadinone =

Chemical compound

Clinical data
- Other names: Chlordione; 17α-Hydroxy-6-chloro-6-dehydroprogesterone; 17α-Hydroxy-6-chloropregna-4,6-diene-3,20-dione; 6-Chloro-17α-hydroxypregna-4,6-diene-3,20-dione
- ATC code: G03DB06 (WHO)

Identifiers
- IUPAC name: (8R,9S,10R,13S,14S,17R)-17-acetyl-6-chloro-17-hydroxy-10,13-dimethyl-2,8,9,11,12,14,15,16-octahydro-1H-cyclopenta[a]phenanthren-3-one
- CAS Number: 1961-77-9
- PubChem CID: 5284533
- ChemSpider: 4447590
- UNII: SDS4N642GG
- CompTox Dashboard (EPA): DTXSID3022796
- ECHA InfoCard: 100.016.185

Chemical and physical data
- Formula: C_{21}H_{27}ClO_{3}
- Molar mass: 362.89 g·mol^{−1}
- 3D model (JSmol): Interactive image
- SMILES: O=C4\C=C3\C(\Cl)=C/[C@@H]1[C@H](CC[C@@]2([C@@](O)(C(=O)C)CC[C@@H]12)C)[C@@]3(C)CC4
- InChI: InChI=1S/C21H27ClO3/c1-12(23)21(25)9-6-16-14-11-18(22)17-10-13(24)4-7-19(17,2)15(14)5-8-20(16,21)3/h10-11,14-16,25H,4-9H2,1-3H3/t14-,15+,16+,19-,20+,21+/m1/s1; Key:VUHJZBBCZGVNDZ-TTYLFXKOSA-N

Chlormadinone is a progestin which was never marketed. An acylated derivative, chlormadinone acetate, is used clinically as a pharmaceutical drug.

It was patented in 1958 and approved for medical use in 1963. While chlormadinone is sometimes used as a synonym for chlormadinone acetate, what is almost always being referred to is chlormadinone acetate and not chlormadinone.

== See also ==
- List of progestogens
