= Chloroethynylnorgestrel =

Chemical compound

Clinical data
- Other names: Chloroethynyl norgestrel; WY-4355; 17α-Chloroethynyl-13β-ethylgon-4-en-17β-ol-3-one; 17α-Chloroethynyl-18-methylestr-4-en-17β-ol-3-one; 17α-Chloroethynyl-18-methyl-19-nortestosterone

Identifiers
- IUPAC name: (1S,2R,10R,11S,14S,15S)-14-(2-Chloroethynyl)-15-ethyl-14-hydroxytetracyclo[8.7.0.0^{2,7}.0^{11,15}]heptadec-6-en-5-one
- CAS Number: 2415-28-3
- PubChem CID: 22790422
- ChemSpider: 18503812
- UNII: Q2YY22B0SV
- CompTox Dashboard (EPA): DTXSID101045228

Chemical and physical data
- Formula: C_{21}H_{27}ClO_{2}
- Molar mass: 346.90 g·mol^{−1}
- 3D model (JSmol): Interactive image
- SMILES: CC[C@]12CC[C@H]3[C@H]([C@@H]1CC[C@]2(C#CCl)O)CCC4=CC(=O)CC[C@H]34
- InChI: InChI=1S/C21H27ClO2/c1-2-20-9-7-17-16-6-4-15(23)13-14(16)3-5-18(17)19(20)8-10-21(20,24)11-12-22/h13,16-19,24H,2-10H2,1H3/t16-,17+,18+,19-,20-,21+/m0/s1; Key:MISOWVVRHHLGIK-ZUHHCLADSA-N

Chloroethynylnorgestrel (developmental code name WY-4355) is a steroidal progestin of the 19-nortestosterone group related to norgestrel that was investigated as an oral contraceptive in the 1970s but was never marketed.

In combination with mestranol, similarly to ethynerone and anagestone acetate (and certain other progestogens, including progesterone and several other 17α-hydroxyprogesterone derivatives), chloroethynylnorgestrel was found to produce striking mammary tumors in beagle dogs after administration at very high dosages (10- to 25-fold human clinical dosages) for prolonged periods of time. This resulted in the discontinuation of its development, along with that of ethynerone and anagestone acetate, as well as the removal of several progestins, including chlormadinone acetate, medroxyprogesterone acetate, and megestrol acetate, from various markets as contraceptives (although medroxyprogesterone acetate has since been reintroduced). Subsequent research revealed that the risk is species-dependent and unique to canines and that there is no similar risk for humans.

Mammary tumors in beagle dogs treated by (left) MK-665 (ethynerone with mestranol) and (right) chloroethynylnorgestrel with mestranol for 4 years at a dosage of 1.05 mg/kg/day cyclically.
