= Chlormadinone acetate =

Chemical compound

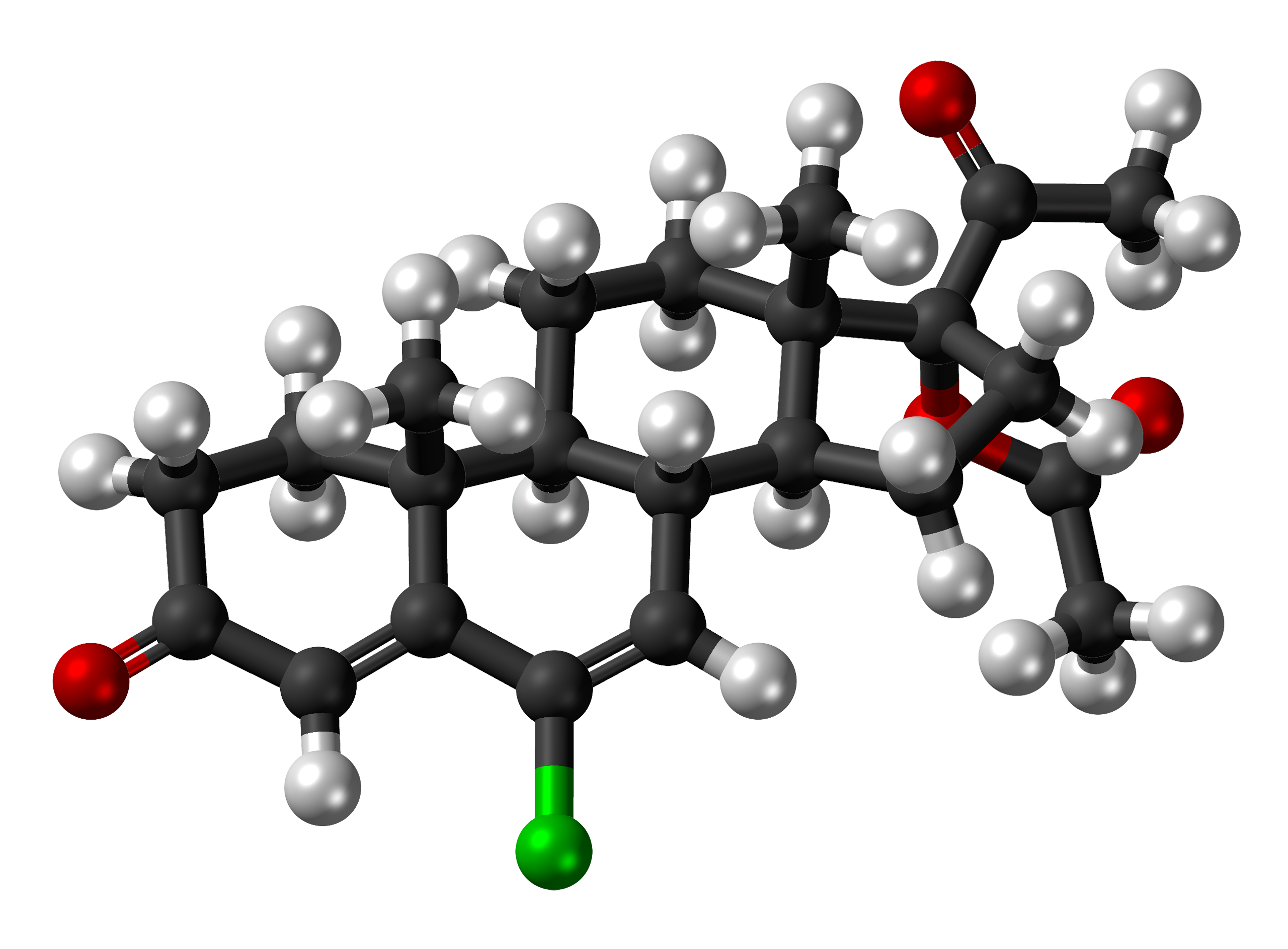

Clinical data
- Trade names: Belara, Lutéran, Prostal, others
- Other names: CMA; RS-1280; ICI-39575; STG-155; NSC-92338; 17α-Acetoxy-6-chloro-6-dehydroprogesterone; 17α-Acetoxy-6-chloropregna-4,6-diene-3,20-dione
- Routes of administration: By mouth
- Drug class: Progestogen; Progestin; Progestogen ester; Antigonadotropin; Steroidal antiandrogen
- ATC code: G03DB06 (WHO)

Legal status
- Legal status: In general: ℞ (Prescription only)

Pharmacokinetic data
- Bioavailability: 100%
- Protein binding: 96.6–99.4% (to albumin and not to SHBG or CBG)
- Metabolism: Liver (reduction, hydroxylation, deacetylation, conjugation)
- Metabolites: • 3α-Hydroxy-CMA • 3β-Hydroxy-CMA • Others
- Elimination half-life: 25–89 hours
- Excretion: Urine: 33–45% Feces: 24–41%

Identifiers
- IUPAC name: [(8R,9S,10R,13S,14S,17R)-17-acetyl-6-chloro-10,13-dimethyl-3-oxo-2,8,9,11,12,14,15,16-octahydro-1H-cyclopenta[a]phenanthren-17-yl] acetate
- CAS Number: 302-22-7 1961-77-9 (chlormadinone)
- PubChem CID: 9324
- DrugBank: DB15903
- ChemSpider: 8963
- UNII: 0SY050L61N
- KEGG: D01299
- ChEBI: CHEBI:31394
- ChEMBL: ChEMBL110691
- CompTox Dashboard (EPA): DTXSID6020274
- ECHA InfoCard: 100.005.563

Chemical and physical data
- Formula: C_{23}H_{29}ClO_{4}
- Molar mass: 404.93 g·mol^{−1}
- 3D model (JSmol): Interactive image
- SMILES: CC(=O)[C@]1(CC[C@@H]2[C@@]1(CC[C@H]3[C@H]2C=C(C4=CC(=O)CC[C@]34C)Cl)C)OC(=O)C
- InChI: InChI=1S/C23H29ClO4/c1-13(25)23(28-14(2)26)10-7-18-16-12-20(24)19-11-15(27)5-8-21(19,3)17(16)6-9-22(18,23)4/h11-12,16-18H,5-10H2,1-4H3/t16-,17+,18+,21-,22+,23+/m1/s1; Key:QMBJSIBWORFWQT-DFXBJWIESA-N

Chlormadinone acetate (CMA), sold under the brand names Belara, Gynorelle, Lutéran, and Prostal among others, is a progestin and antiandrogen medication which is used in birth control pills to prevent pregnancy, as a component of menopausal hormone therapy, in the treatment of gynecological disorders, and in the treatment of androgen-dependent conditions like enlarged prostate and prostate cancer in men and acne and hirsutism in women. It is available both at a low dose in combination with an estrogen in birth control pills and, in a few countries like France and Japan, at low, moderate, and high doses alone for various indications. It is taken by mouth.

Side effects of the combination of an estrogen and CMA include menstrual irregularities, headaches, nausea, breast tenderness, vaginal discharge, and others. At high dosages, CMA can cause sexual dysfunction, demasculinization, adrenal insufficiency, and changes in carbohydrate metabolism among other adverse effects. The drug is a progestin, or a synthetic progestogen, and hence is an agonist of the progesterone receptor, the biological target of progestogens like progesterone. It is also an antiandrogen, and hence is an antagonist of the androgen receptor, the biological target of androgens like testosterone and dihydrotestosterone. Due to its progestogenic activity, CMA has antigonadotropic effects. The medication has weak glucocorticoid activity and no other important hormonal activity.

CMA was discovered in 1959 and was introduced for medical use in 1965. It may be considered a "first-generation" progestin. The medication was withdrawn in some countries in 1970 due to concerns about mammary toxicity observed in dogs, but this turned out not to apply to humans. CMA is available widely throughout the world in birth control pills, but is notably not marketed in any predominantly English-speaking countries. It is available alone in only a few countries, including France, Mexico, Japan, and South Korea.

== Medical uses ==
CMA is used at a low dose in combination with ethinylestradiol (EE), an estrogen, in combined birth control pills. It has also been used in the treatment of gynecological conditions including vaginal bleeding, oligomenorrhea, polymenorrhea, hypermenorrhea, dysmenorrhea, secondary amenorrhea, and endometriosis and in France (under the brand name Lutéran) in menopausal hormone therapy in combination with an estrogen. CMA is used at dosages of 1 to 2 mg/day in combined birth control pills and at dosages of 2 to 10 mg/day in the treatment of gynecological disorders. Combined birth control pills containing EE and CMA have been found to be useful in reducing androgen-dependent symptoms such as skin and hair conditions. Dosages of CMA of 15 to 20 mg/day have been found to improve hot flashes. High-dose CMA-only tablets are used as a form of progestogen-only birth control, although they are not specifically licensed as such.

CMA has been widely used as a means of androgen deprivation therapy in the treatment of prostate cancer and benign prostatic hyperplasia (BPH) in Japan and South Korea, but has seen little use for these indications elsewhere in the world. It is used at dosages of 50 to 100 mg/day in the treatment of prostate diseases. Similarly to cyproterone acetate (CPA), CMA shows a lower risk of hot flashes than gonadotropin-releasing hormone analogues (GnRH analogues). The medication is the only other steroidal antiandrogen besides CPA that has been approved and used for the treatment of prostate cancer; megestrol acetate has also been researched, but has not been approved.

CMA has also been found to be effective in the treatment of other androgen-dependent conditions such as acne, seborrhea, hirsutism, and pattern hair loss in women, similarly to CPA. It has been studied at moderate dosages of 4 to 12 mg/day in the treatment of precocious puberty in girls. It showed similar benefits as those of medroxyprogesterone acetate in these girls and was found to reduce, but not abolish premature development such as breast growth and menstruation. Only slight or no axillary hair growth was observed in the girls. CMA has also been used as a component of hormone therapy for transgender women, similarly to CPA and spironolactone, albeit mostly only in Japan.

CMA has been used to prevent the testosterone flare at the start of gonadotropin-releasing hormone agonist therapy in men with prostate cancer.

=== Available forms ===
CMA is available in the form of oral tablets at low doses (2 mg) in combination with EE in birth control pills (e.g., as Belara in Germany and Brazil), at low to moderate doses (2, 5, 10, 25 mg) alone (e.g., as Lutéran in France and Lutoral in Mexico), and at high doses (50 mg) alone (e.g., as Prostal in Japan and Prostal-L in South Korea).

== Contraindications ==
Contraindications of combined birth control pills, such as those containing EE and CMA, include known or suspected pregnancy, lactation and breastfeeding, a history of or known susceptibility to thromboembolism, cholestasis (but not liver cirrhosis or chronic hepatitis), and breast cancer among others. CMA is a teratogen in animals and may have the potential to cause fetal harm, such as feminization of male fetuses among other defects.

== Side effects ==
The most common side effects of birth control pills containing EE and low-dose CMA have been found to include menstrual abnormalities, headache (37%), nausea (23%), breast tenderness (22%), and vaginal discharge (19%) among others. These formulations do not adversely affect sexual desire or function in women and show little or no risk of depression, mood swings, or weight gain. High-dosage CMA is associated with sexual dysfunction (e.g., reduced libido, erectile dysfunction), reduced body hair, adrenal insufficiency, and alterations in carbohydrate metabolism. Conversely, it does not share adverse effects of estrogens such as breast discomfort and gynecomastia. CMA does not increase the risk of venous thromboembolism. There is a case report of autoimmune progesterone dermatitis with CMA. Similarly to other progestins but in contrast to progesterone, CMA has been found to significantly increase the risk of breast cancer when used in combination with an estrogen in menopausal hormone therapy. No abnormalities in liver function tests have been observed in women taking combined birth control pills containing CMA or CPA. Unlike CPA, high-dosage CMA does not seem to be associated with hepatotoxicity.

Similarly to megestrol acetate and medroxyprogesterone acetate, CMA appears to show less potential for liver genotoxicity and carcinogenicity than CPA in bioassays. This seems to be related to the lack of the C1α,2α methylene group of CPA in these steroids. A case of hepatocellular carcinoma has been reported in a woman taking a birth control pill containing CMA. However, the incidence of liver tumors in women in association with CMA-containing birth control pills appears to be similar to that for birth control pills containing other progestins.

== Overdose ==
CMA has been studied in men with advanced prostate cancer at massive dosages of 1,000 to 2,000 mg/day orally and 100 to 500 mg/day via intramuscular injection, without serious adverse effects or toxicity described.

== Interactions ==
As CMA does not inhibit cytochrome P450 enzymes, it may have a lower risk of drug interactions than 19-nortestosterone progestins.

== Pharmacology ==
=== Pharmacodynamics ===
CMA has progestogenic activity, antigonadotropic effects, antiandrogenic activity, and weak glucocorticoid activity.

Relative affinities (%) of CMA and metabolites
Compound	PR	AR	ER	GR	MR	SHBG	CBG
CMA	67–172	3–76	0	8	0	0	0
3α-Hydroxy-CMA	33	4	?	2	?	?	?
3β-Hydroxy-CMA	72	15	?	6	?	?	?
Notes: Values are percentages (%). Reference ligands (100%) were promegestone for the PR, metribolone for the AR, E2 for the ER, DEXA for the GR, aldosterone for the MR, DHT for SHBG, and cortisol for CBG. Sources:

==== Progestogenic activity ====
CMA is a progestogen, or an agonist of the progesterone receptor. It is highly potent in its progestogenic activity, with about 330 times the potency of progesterone in the Clauberg test and about 2,000 to 10,000 times the oral potency of progesterone in the McPhail assay. For comparison, the potencies of medroxyprogesterone acetate and CPA in the Clauberg assay were about 330- and 1,000-fold that of progesterone, respectively. The progestogenic activity of CMA is responsible for its functional antigonadotropic and antiestrogenic effects and for its contraceptive effects. The oral ovulation-inhibiting dosage of CMA in women is 1.5 to 4 mg/day and its endometrial transformation dosage is 25 mg/cycle. In one study of ovulation inhibition, CMA was 68% effective at 1 mg/day, 85% effective at 2 mg/day, and 100% effective at 4 mg/day. The effective dosage of CMA as a progestogen-only pill for contraception is 0.5 mg/day. Inhibition of ovulation is incomplete at this dosage and contraceptive effects are instead mainly achieved via progestogenic changes in the endometrium and cervix.

In rabbit bioassays, PR activation was similar for CMA and its major active metabolites 3α-hydroxychlormadinone acetate (3α-OH-CMA) and 3β-hydroxychlormadinone acetate (3β-OH-CMA).

==== Antigonadotropic effects ====
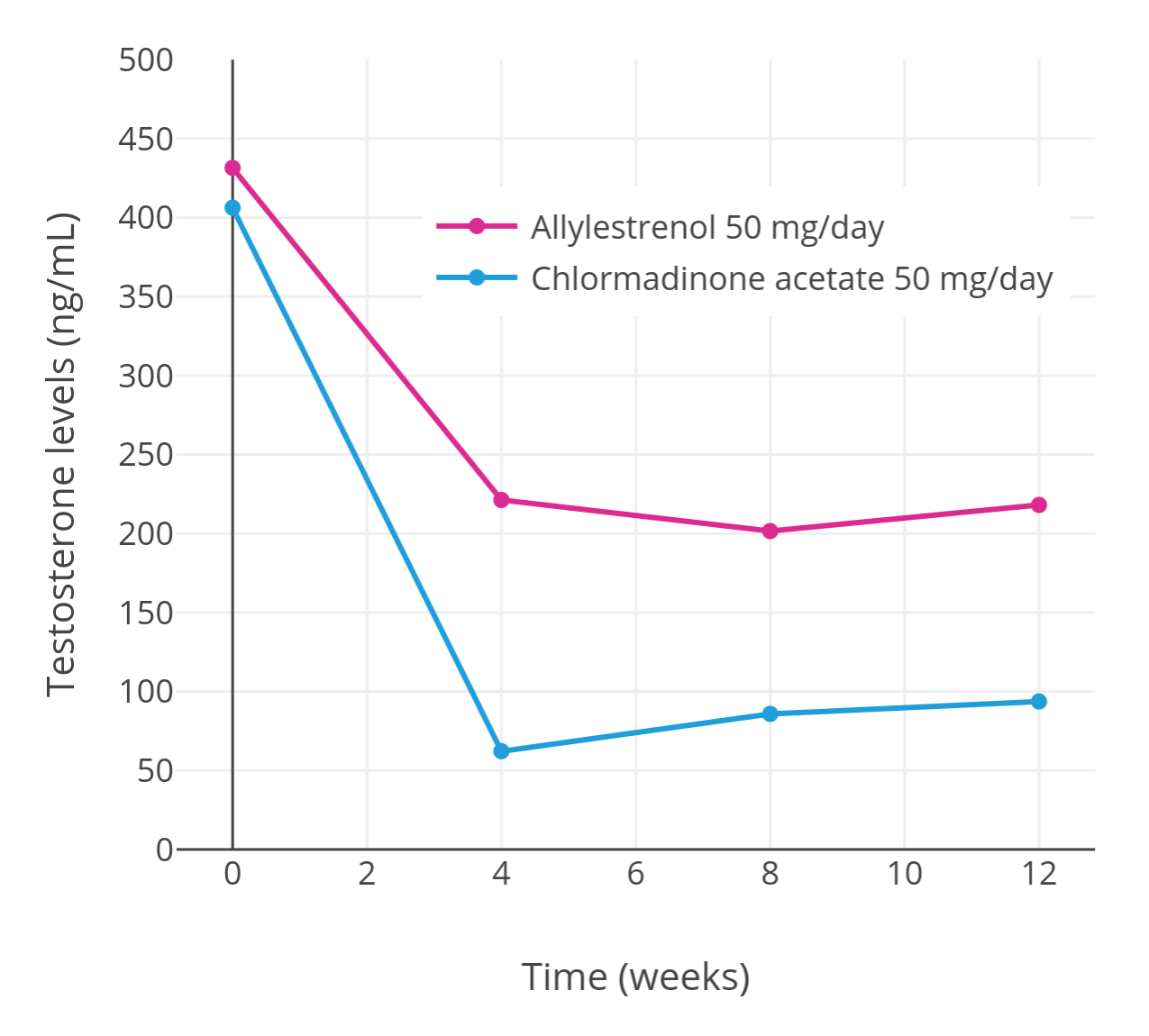
Testosterone levels with 50 mg/day allylestrenol or 50 mg/day CMA orally over 12 weeks in men with benign prostatic hyperplasia.

Due to its progestogenic activity, CMA has antigonadotropic effects, and hence can inhibit the secretion of the gonadotropins luteinizing hormone (LH) and follicle-stimulating hormone (FSH) from the pituitary gland. As a result, CMA suppresses ovulation and gonadal sex hormone production and can strongly decrease circulating testosterone and estradiol levels at sufficiently high dosages. The medication at a dosage of 50 mg/day has been found to suppress testosterone levels by about 76 to 85% (to approximately 50–100 ng/dL) and estradiol levels by about 55 to 59% (to approximately 7–8 pg/mL) in men with BPH. As such, CMA has powerful functional antiandrogenic and antiestrogenic effects via its antigonadotropic effects.

==== Antiandrogenic activity ====
CMA is a potent antiandrogen, or antagonist of the androgen receptor (AR), with about 30 to 40% of the affinity of CPA for the receptor and about 20% of the antiandrogenic potency of CPA in animals. Like other progestins with antiandrogenic activity such as CPA, megestrol acetate, and spironolactone, but unlike nonsteroidal antiandrogens such as flutamide and bicalutamide, CMA is not a silent antagonist of the AR but rather a weak partial agonist with the capacity to activate the receptor in the absence of more efficacious agonists such as testosterone. In rabbit bioassays, AR antagonism was similar for CMA and 3α-OH-CMA but lower for 3β-OH-CMA. Both the antigonadotropic and antiandrogenic actions of CMA are thought to be involved in its effectiveness in the treatment of prostate cancer.

When low-dose CMA is combined with EE, as in combined birth control pills, the antiandrogenic activity of CMA is reinforced, due to a large increase in sex hormone-binding globulin (SHBG) levels and consequent fall in free testosterone levels induced by EE. Unlike 19-nortestosterone progestins like levonorgestrel, CMA does not antagonize the EE-induced increase in SHBG levels.

==== Other activity ====
Similarly to other 17α-hydroxyprogesterone derivatives such as CPA, medroxyprogesterone acetate, and megestrol acetate, CMA has weak affinity for the glucocorticoid receptor (comparable to that of progesterone) and weak glucocorticoid activity, and has the potential to cause adrenal insufficiency upon abrupt discontinuation at sufficient dosages. However, the medication shows significant glucocorticoid activity only at dosages much higher than those present in birth control pills. In rabbit bioassays, GR activation was highest for CMA but less for 3α-OH-CMA and not observed with 3β-OH-CMA (suggesting that it may, in contrast, be a lower efficacy partial agonist or antagonist of the GR). CMA has no affinity for the estrogen or mineralocorticoid receptors and has no estrogenic or antimineralocorticoid activity. Unlike progesterone but similarly to other progestins, CMA has no known neurosteroid activity (e.g., GABA_{A} receptor modulation) or sedative effects.

CMA has been reported to be a competitive inhibitor of 5α-reductase. However, it seems to shows very low potency in this action, with 0.0% inhibition of the enzyme at a concentration of 1 μM, and in relation to this, has been said not to have an important influence on the enzyme. CMA may also act weakly as a testosterone biosynthesis inhibitor at high dosages. Unlike 19-nortestosterone progestins, CMA does not inhibit enzymes in the cytochrome P450 system, which may give it a lower risk of drug interactions.

Certain progestins have been found to stimulate the proliferation of MCF-7 breast cancer cells in vitro, an action that is independent of the classical PRs and is instead mediated via the progesterone receptor membrane component-1 (PGRMC1). Progesterone and CMA, in contrast, act neutrally in this assay. It is unclear if these findings may explain the different risks of breast cancer observed with progesterone and progestins in clinical studies.

=== Pharmacokinetics ===
The oral bioavailability of CMA is 100%, which is due to low first-pass metabolism. In combination with 30 μg EE, a single 2 mg oral dose of CMA produced maximal serum levels of 1.6 ng/mL after about 1 to 2 hours and chronic administration produced steady-state levels of 2.0 ng/mL. Steady-state concentrations of CMA are achieved after 7 to 15 days. The distribution half-life of CMA is about 2.5 hours. The medication is highly lipophilic and is taken up into and accumulated in fat and some female reproductive tissues, although this may only occur at high dosages (e.g., ≥10 mg/day). The volume of distribution of CMA is unknown, but that of the closely related steroid CPA is very large at 1,300 L. The plasma protein binding of CMA is 96.6 to 99.4%, with about 1 to 3% free. It is bound to albumin, with no affinity for SHBG or corticosteroid-binding globulin.

CMA is extensively metabolized in the liver by reduction, hydroxylation, deacetylation, and conjugation. Reduction occurs at the C3 ketone with preservation of the δ^{4(5)} double bond, hydroxylation is at the C2α, C3α, C3β, and C15β positions, and conjugation includes glucuronidation and sulfation. The main metabolites of CMA are 2α-OH-CMA, 3α-OH-CMA, and 3β-OH-CMA, with the latter two being important active metabolites. Other metabolites of CMA are inactive. The elimination half-life of CMA has been reported to be 25 to 34 hours after a single dose and 34 to 39 hours after multiple doses, although some publications have reported its half-life to be as long as 80 to 89 hours. Enterohepatic reabsorption of CMA occurs. The medication has been found to be excreted 33 to 45% in urine and 24 to 41% in feces, as well as in bile. Only 74% of a dose is excreted 7 days after administration, which is due to accumulation of CMA in tissues and low clearance.

== Chemistry ==
CMA, also known as 17α-acetoxy-6-chloro-6-dehydroprogesterone or as 17α-acetoxy-6-chloropregna-4,6-diene-3,20-dione, is a synthetic pregnane steroid and derivative of progesterone. It is specifically a derivative of 17α-hydroxyprogesterone with a chlorine atom at the C6 position, a double bond between the C6 and C7 positions, and an acetate ester at the C17α position. CMA is the C17α acetate ester of chlormadinone, which, in contrast to CMA, was never marketed. Analogues of CMA include other 17α-hydroxyprogesterone derivatives such as CPA, delmadinone acetate, hydroxyprogesterone caproate, medroxyprogesterone acetate, megestrol acetate, and osaterone acetate. CMA is identical in chemical structure to CPA except that it lacks the 1α,2α-methylene substitution of CPA. The structure of CMA is also nearly the same as those of delmadinone acetate and osaterone acetate, which similarly have A-ring modifications.

=== Synthesis ===
Chemical syntheses of CMA have been published.

== History ==
CMA was discovered and first described in 1959. It was marketed in combination with mestranol by Eli Lilly under the brand name C-Quens from 1965 to 1971 in the United States. It was the first sequential contraceptive pill to be introduced in the U.S. CMA has also been marketed in combination with mestranol under the brand names Ovosiston, Aconcen, and Sequens. Due to findings of mammary gland nodules in beagle dogs (see below), C-Quens was voluntarily withdrawn from the U.S. market by Eli Lilly in 1971 and all oral contraceptives of CMA were discontinued in the U.S. by 1972. However, subsequent research found that there is no such risk in humans, and CMA has continued to be widely used in oral contraceptives in many other countries, such as Germany and China. The antiandrogenic activity of CMA was first described in 1966, and the medication was subsequently developed for use alone at high dosages in the treatment of androgen-dependent conditions like prostate cancer.

In the 1960s, CMA was introduced as a component of oral contraceptives. However, around 1970, such formulations were withdrawn from many markets such as the United States and United Kingdom due to the finding that CMA induced alarming mammary gland tumors in Beagle dogs. The doses administered that caused the nodules were 10 or 25 times the recommended human dosage for an extended period of time (2–4 years), while no tumors were found in dogs treated with 1–2 times the human dosage. In addition to CMA, mammary tumors were found in dogs with various other 17α-hydroxyprogesterone derivatives, including medroxyprogesterone acetate, megestrol acetate, and anagestone acetate, and they were also discontinued for the indication of hormonal contraception (although medroxyprogesterone acetate has since been reintroduced). Tumors were also observed with progesterone, as well as with ethynerone and chloroethynylnorgestrel, but notably not with the non-halogenated 19-nortestosterone derivatives norgestrel, norethisterone, noretynodrel, or etynodiol diacetate, which remained on the market. In any case, according to Hughes et al., "It is still doubtful how much relevance these findings have for humans as the dog mammary gland seems to be the only one which can be directly maintained by progestogens." Subsequent research revealed species differences between dogs and humans and established that there is no similar risk in humans.

CMA was the first progestogen to be studied as a progestogen-only pill ("minipill"). It was discontinued and replaced by other progestins such as norethisterone and norgestrel after the findings of toxicity in beagle dogs.

== Society and culture ==
=== Generic names ===
Chlormadinone acetate is the generic name of the drug and its INN, USAN, BAN, and JAN. It is also known by its developmental code name RS-1280.

=== Brand names ===
CMA has been marketed under a variety of brand names throughout the world including Clordion, Gestafortin, Gestogan, Lormin, Lutéran, Lutoral, Menstridyl, Non-Ovlon, Normenon, Prococyd, Progestormon, Prostal, Synchrogest, Verton, and many others. It is most commonly marketed in combination with EE as a combined birth control pill under the brand names Belara and to a lesser extent Belarina among others. The medication has been marketed for use in veterinary medicine under the brand names Anifertil, Chronosyn, Cyclonorm, Fertiletten, Synchrosyn, and others.

=== Availability ===
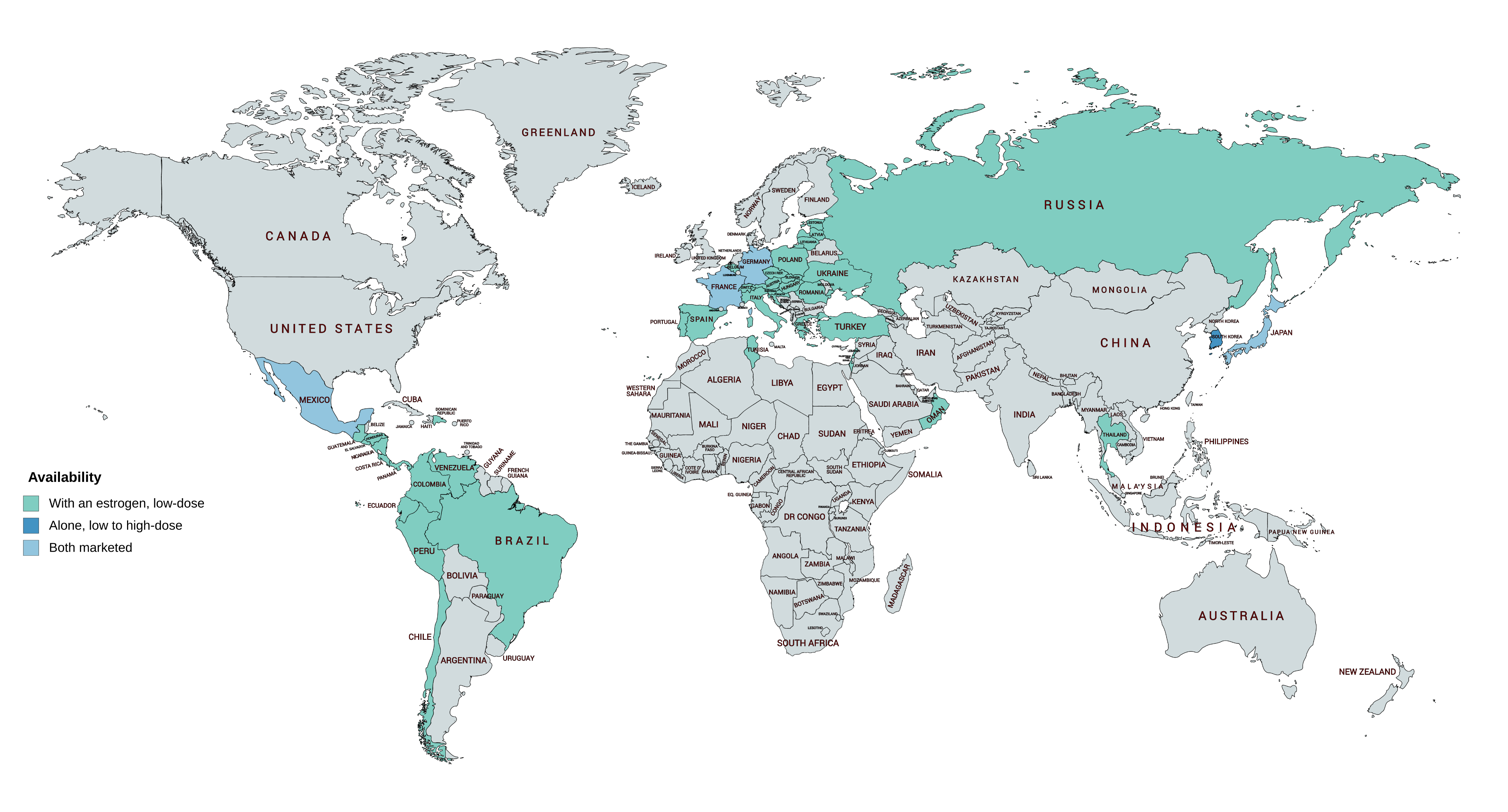
Availability of chlormadinone acetate in countries throughout the world (as of April 2018). Turquoise is in combination with ethinylestradiol (EE) at a low dose, dark blue is alone at low, moderate, and/or high doses, and light blue is both available.

CMA is available alone at low, moderate, and/or high doses in France (brand name Lutéran), Germany (generics, and formerly Gestafortin), Japan (brand name Prostal), Mexico (brand name Lutoral), and South Korea (brand name Prostal-L). It is available in many countries in combination with EE, including throughout most of Europe and Latin America, and in Japan, Thailand, Israel, Lebanon, Tunisia, and Oman (but notably not South Korea). CMA is not available in English-speaking countries including the United States, Canada, the United Kingdom, Ireland, South Africa, Australia, or New Zealand, nor is it marketed in any of the Nordic countries. CMA was previously marketed in the United States and the United Kingdom in the 1960s, but it was withdrawn in these countries in 1970 due to intermittent concerns about mammary toxicity in dogs.

=== Generation ===
Progestins in birth control pills are sometimes grouped by generation. While the 19-nortestosterone progestins are consistently grouped into generations, the pregnane progestins used in birth control pills are typically omitted from such classifications or are grouped as "miscellaneous" or "pregnanes". In any case, based on its date of introduction in such formulations of 1965, CMA could be considered a "first-generation" progestin.

== Veterinary use ==
In addition to its use in humans, CMA has been used in veterinary medicine.
