= Nand Peeters =

Belgian obstetrician and gynecologist

Ferdinand "Nand" Peeters (October 13, 1918, in Mechelen – December 27, 1998, in Turnhout) was a Belgian obstetrician and gynecologist, whose research led directly to the development of Anovlar, the first combined oral contraceptive pill introduced outside the United States, in 1961, the first whose side-effects were acceptable, and the first that was used world-wide (Albach 1997:939). It remained in production, in its original formula, from its introduction until 1986 — although, beginning in 1964, Schering AG (the company that produced it) also marketed variants with lower doses of hormones, some of which continued to be named Anovlar. Nand Peeters's research also contributed substantially to the treatment of Rh-disease.

== Biography ==
Nand Peeters was a son of Désiré Peeters, a surgeon who founded his own clinic in Mechelen. After attending the local Saint Rumbold's high school, he studied at the Catholic University of Leuven, intending to become a gynecologist. But he finished his training in a maternity ward in Bruges. In 1945 he married Paula Langbeen, with whom he had six children, and who was his book-keeper all his life—Peeters detested all administrative work. In 1946 he settled as an ob-gyn in Turnhout. At the time Turnhout had none, even though it was (and is) the largest town in the northern part of the Campine, with a population then of about 32,000. Perinatal infant mortality in Turnhout was between 10 and 12% before his arrival; in his first year in Turnhout he managed to bring it down to two cases in some 500 deliveries.

He was appointed head of the Maria Gabriël Maternity and of the gynecology department of Turnhout's municipal Saint-Elisabeth hospital in 1951. Under his direction, that department became one of the best in the country. He acquired the most modern technology available, did innovative research, encouraged young and promising doctors that he hired to do likewise, and introduced new techniques like echography. In 1952 Leuven University appointed him as one of its supervisors of trainee doctors. This appointment was withdrawn in 1963, for reasons that remain unclear.

In 1953, also in Turnhout, he founded the Saint-Elisabeth nursing school, where he taught for free. Naturally the school provided him with well-trained nursing staff, whom he entrusted with far greater responsibilities than was customary at the time. He retired in 1986. An intracranial hemorrhage in 1988 ended his active life—communication became impossible. He lived another ten years, dying on December 27, 1998.

== Ob-gyn ==
Peeters was first and foremost a practicing ob-gyn, with over 30,000 deliveries. Throughout his career, his abiding concern was for the comfort of his patients. He was said to be a man of few words, but a good listener, and the stories told by his patients testify to the respect in which they held him and the trust they put in him.

He did research, taught, and lectured to and published for both health care professionals and the general public. But he did all this because he hoped thereby to improve the welfare of his patients and of pregnant and nubile women in general. Typically, pain management during delivery was the first problem he tackled as a researcher, while still a trainee in Bruges.

=== The development of Anovlar ===
Peeters closely followed the development of various hormones and their uses in the nineteen-fifties. He was aware of the work of Pincus and of the serious side-effects of Pincus's Enovid, which was first introduced as a remedy against menstrual disorders in 1957. He knew that Schering AG had developed a number of hormones, and when Jean Frenay, a representative of Schering, told him the firm had combined two of them, norethisterone acetate and ethinylestradiol into an experimental preparation called SH-513 (containing 2 mg of the former and 0.01 mg of the latter) he asked for enough SH-513 to test it on a number of his patients. Peeters, wrote Frenay to Schering, "principally thinks of ovulation inhibition for contraceptive purposes." Thus the idea of developing SH-513 into a contraceptive pill stemmed from Peeters, not from Schering. In fact, initially Schering's principal gynecologist wanted Peeters to test SH-513 as a treatment for dysmenorrhea. Eventually, Peeters got formal permission from Schering to test SH-513 for the purpose of contraception.

Peeters selected from his patients those whose prognosis envisioned the risks of dying in childbirth, of stillbirth, and/or of Rh disease. He told them explicitly that he was developing a new medication, and got their permission to test it on them. The results of his small-scale trial (on no more than 50 fertile married women) led him to conclude that a dose of 3 to 4 mg of norethisterone acetate and 'at least' 0.05 mg of ethinylestradiol was both efficient and had few side effects. Schering then made its SH-639 using this dose, and had it tested in trials in Germany, Australia, Japan and the USA on 14,038 menstrual cycles of 2433 women. The conclusion was an outright recommendation to introduce SH-639 as a hormonal contraceptive.

But Schering hesitated to introduce it in Germany, fearing comparison with Nazi eugenics, still a painful memory in that country. It was first introduced in Australia, in February 1961, as "Anovlar", a name intended to mean 'without ovulation'. The following table shows Anovlar's introduction times in a number of countries:

- Australia: February 1961
- Germany: June 1961
- Switzerland: October 1961
- Austria: June 1962
- France: February 1964
- Spain: June 1964
- Belgium: March 1965
- Italy: end of the 1960s
- Japan: beginning of the 1970s only for "gynecological indications"; June 1999 for contraceptive purposes

== Fame ==
The results of Peeters's research were published as Peeters F., M. Van Roy & R. Oeyen 1960. (Van Roy was Peeters's clinical biologist; Oeyen, his assistant.) Requests for offprints came flooding in from all over the world, especially after the introduction of Anovlar, over 50,000 of them.

He addressed the Third World Congress of Gynecology and Obstetrics (Vienna, September 1961) and the 60th Congress of the North-West-German Gynecological Society (Kiel, 1961). He also spoke at the Second Fertility Congress in Brussels, where he met with Eleanor Mears, co-author of a highly favorable report of a large-scale clinical trial of Anovlar, published in the prestigious BMJ.

In the early sixties, his reputation was considerable.

== Fall into obscurity ==
But in his own country, Peeters faced problems. Until 1973, publications on birth control were liable to fall foul of Belgian law, which considered them obscene. In Belgium, Peeters had to keep quiet about his work.

In addition, Belgium was a very catholic country, and at the time the Catholic Church's controlling document on hormonal contraception was Casti connubii, which flatly forbade it. Peeters's employ was in the hands of the town council of Turnhout, entirely dominated by the Christian People's Party. The threat of losing his job, which he loved, was real, and he had to tread very carefully as long as the church forbade artificial contraception and as long as Turnhout remained monolithically catholic, i.e., throughout his active life.

However, since October 1958, John XXIII was pope, and Aggiornamento seemed possible, even in his church's view on birth control. Nand Peeters thought so. On May 1, 1963, he was granted a short private audience with John XXIII, from which he came away with the impression "that the pope provided support for the pill". At any rate, in 1963 John XXIII established the Pontifical Commission on Birth Control, which continued its work under the aegis of pope Paul VI, though in a much expanded composition. In 1964, Paul VI convened the First European Congress of Catholic Doctors (Malta, 1964), which was almost entirely devoted to birth control. Peeters was one of the speakers.

When Paul VI confirmed the church's total rejection of birth control by "artificial methods" in his Humanae vitae in 1968, Peeters was greatly disappointed and angry. But he was a devout and committed catholic, and he could not square it with his conscience to publicly distance himself from the teaching of the church.

The Catholic Church's ban on artificial birth control as well as the political situation in Turnhout left him no choice but to withdraw into silence. This he did so successfully that his own children knew only vaguely that he had had something to do with Anovlar. That it was he who actually developed it they discovered only in 1995, when Schering, unaware of Peeters's medical condition, asked him for help in contributing to the eponymous catalog (Staupe & Vieth 1996) of Die Pille: Von der Lust und von der Liebe, an exhibition put on by the German Hygiene Museum.

The result was that his name fell into oblivion. When he died, only the local Turnhout press reported on his death.

== Peeters's ethics about the pill ==
Peeters never accepted his church's absolute prohibition of the pill. He never repudiated his work on Anovlar. On the contrary, he was quietly proud of it. When he was asked to contribute an article on himself in a Dutch version of Who's Who, he cited just one publication, Peeters 1970, his Dutch adaptation of a German work on hormone treatment, intended for doctors. He wanted them to continue to use hormones, including Anovlar, which he discussed in this book without mentioning his role in its development. And he continued to do research, not only on Anovlar, but also on other pills, such as Eugynon, Aconcen and Sequilar. However, he published his results only in medical journals.

More importantly, he unhesitatingly prescribed the pill when he deemed that a patient's health was threatened by too many pregnancies (too often life-threatening ones—ten or twelve children was not unusual in the Campine in the sixties), by late pregnancies or by the threat of yet another stillbirth, due, e.g., to Rh-disease. He would not have others, whoever they might be, influence his medical judgment, and for him the health of his patient always remained paramount. Also, he defended in no uncertain terms a couple's right to decide on the number of children they would have: "It is you and your husband who decide the number of your children, and that's not the pope's business."

Even so, Peeters remained a fundamentally conservative catholic, who strongly disapproved of the loose mores of the sexual revolution, largely due to the pill, and who agreed with his church that coitus should only take place within marriage.

== Other research ==
In 1964, Ortho Pharmaceutical asked Peeters to participate in a clinical trial of a variant of RhoGAM, its Rho(D) immune globulin. He accepted. Peeters took the lead of a small team of doctors and a great number of midwives, whom he alerted to the problem of Rh-disease and who, aware of his excellent reputation in the region, willingly cooperated. The medication was tested on more than 700 women, and the trial was a resounding success: not a single case of Rh-disease was reported, leading one of his colleagues to say that it made the Campine the first Rh-disease free region in the world. When he presented the results to a Berlin conference attended by over 2500 gynecologists and pediatricians, it turned out that his was by far the most extensive clinical trial. But he ascribed its success to the midwives and the maternities involved in the study, and he did not even publish his results. He was too busy lecturing and teaching refresher courses to doctors.

== Nonmedical activities ==
Whilst studying and for some time after his study, he was also a prominent leader in a catholic youth movement, the "Katholieke Studenten Actie" (KSA). His was a serious and time-consuming commitment: he wrote a brochure (Peeters 1944) for them, and in the days before his marriage, he could not be reached for a while, because he was inspecting KSA summer camps (together with Pieter De Somer, another KSA-leader who was to become a noted medical researcher).

In 1948, upon the death of Jozef Simons, Nand Peeters succeeded him as chairman of the Turnhout branch of the Davidsfonds, a function which he retained until 1965.

== Trivia ==
- In 1970 the then Minister of Culture Frans Van Mechelen sent one of his collaborators to the immensely popular Nand Peeters to ask him to run for mayor of Turnhout for the Christian People's Party. Peeters refused: a doctor should be there for everyone, and not be beholden to a political party.
- On October 23, 1985, Pope John Paul II granted Peeters the Pro Ecclesia et Pontifice award, obviously not for his development of Anovlar, but for his services to education.
- On Monday March 31, 2014, the Turnhout City Council decided that a street in a new social housing development is to be named "Dokter Nand Peetersstraat". The Dokter Nand Peetersstraat has since been built; its first inhabitants moved in on May 31, 2016.
- Early in 2014 Belgian Radio 1 organized a poll asking its listeners what they considered "the best Belgian invention of all times". As soon as "Dr. Peeters's Pill" was nominated, it received massive support, almost exclusively from women. In the broadcast of the final, on April 4, 2014, it received 38% of the votes, outpolling the saxophone, the Mercator projection, the Belgian praline and JPEG by wide margins.
- On June 12, 2017, the Belgian post office bpost issued a First Day Sheet "Medische doorbraken/Avancées médicales" (Medical Breakthroughs), which featured a stamp in honor of Nand Peeters, showing his picture and a picture of the original Anovlar package.

== Sources ==
Unless otherwise indicated, all information in this article is based on Van den Broeck 2014. A great deal of information in English can be found in Van den Broeck, Janssens & Defoort 2012 (an article in a peer-reviewed journal) and in Hope 2010. German publications are Albach 1993 [in particular pp. 922–999, "Case F: Die Entwicklung der «Pille» (Oral Contraceptives)"] and Sieg 1996.

- Albach, Horst 1993 Culture and Technical Innovation: A Cross-Cultural Analysis and Policy Recommendations Forschungsbericht 9/Akademie der Wissenschaften zu Berlin (Berlin: Walter de Gruyter) ISBN 3 11 013947 2
- Hope, Alan 2010 "The little pill that could" in Flanders Today May 24, 2010 (also available here)
- Mears, Eleanor & Ellen C.G. Grant 1962 "«Anovlar» as an Oral Contraceptive" in BMJ, July 14:75–79
- Peeters, Nand 1944 Het groot avontuur in K.S.A.-Jong-Vlaanderen (no place: [KSA] Dienst voor Openluchtleven: Afdeeling Spelen)
- Peeters, Nand 1970 Oestrogenen en gestagenen: De behandeling met oestrogenen en gestagenen in de dagelijkse praktijk (Antwerpen: Standaard)
- Peeters F., M. Van Roy & R. Oeyen 1960 "Ovulationsunterdrückung durch Progestagene" in Geburtshilfe und Frauenheilkunde 20(12):1306–1314
- Sieg, Sabine 1996 "«Anovlar» – die erste europäische Pille: Zur Geschichte eines Medikaments" in Staupe & Vieth 1966:131–144
- Staupe, Gisela, & Lisa Vieth, eds. 1996 Die Pille: Von der Lust und von der Liebe (Berlin: Rowohlt) ISBN 3 87134 2572
- Van den Broeck, Karl 2014 De echte vader van de pil: Het verhaal van de man die de vrouw bevrijdde (Antwerpen: Bezige Bij) ISBN 978 90 8542 626 4 [Now (October 2018) also in English: Doctor Ferdinand Peeters: The Real Father of the Pill Oud-Turnhout (Belgium) & 's-Hertogenbosch (Netherlands): Gompel&Svacina bvba. ISBN 978 94 6371 054 1]
- Van den Broeck, K., D. Janssens & P. Defoort 2012 "A forgotten founding father of the Pill: Ferdinand Peeters, MD" in The European Journal of Contraception & Reproductive Health Care 17:321–328 (In October 2018 also available here)
- Wlasich, Gert J. 2011 Die Schering AG in der Zeit des Nazionalsozialismus: Beiträge zur Unternehmenskultur in einem Berliner Konzern (Berlin: Kalwang & Eis) ISBN 978-3-9814203-1-9
