= The European Journal of Contraception & Reproductive Health Care =

- Discipline: Obstetrics, gynecology, reproductive medicine, contraception
- Language: English
- Edited by: Giovanni Grandi

Publication details
- History: 1996-present
- Publisher: Taylor & Francis
- Frequency: Bimonthly
- Impact factor: 1.7 (2022)

Standard abbreviations
- ISO 4: Eur. J. Contracept. Reprod. Health Care

Indexing
- ISSN: 1362-5187 (print); 1473-0782 (web)

Links
- Journal homepage; online access

The European Journal of Contraception and Reproductive Health Care is a peer-reviewed medical journal that covers all areas of contraception and reproductive health. It is the official journal of the European Society of Contraception and Reproductive Health.
