= Anagestone acetate =

Chemical compound

Clinical data
- Trade names: Anatropin, Neo-Novum
- Other names: ORF-1658; Anapregnone acetate; 3-Deketo-6α-methyl-17α-acetoxyprogesterone; 6α-Methyl-17α-hydroxypregn-4-en-20-one acetate
- Routes of administration: By mouth
- Drug class: Progestogen; Progestin; Progestogen ester

Identifiers
- IUPAC name: [(6S,8R,9S,10R,13S,14S,17R)-17-acetyl-6,10,13-trimethyl-1,2,3,6,7,8,9,11,12,14,15,16-dodecahydrocyclopenta[a]phenanthren-17-yl] acetate
- CAS Number: 3137-73-3
- PubChem CID: 252301
- ChemSpider: 221058
- UNII: GNT396G9QT
- KEGG: D02932
- ChEBI: CHEBI:135575
- CompTox Dashboard (EPA): DTXSID50953411
- ECHA InfoCard: 100.019.578

Chemical and physical data
- Formula: C_{24}H_{36}O_{3}
- Molar mass: 372.549 g·mol^{−1}
- 3D model (JSmol): Interactive image
- SMILES: C[C@H]1C[C@@H]2[C@H](CC[C@]3([C@H]2CC[C@@]3(C(=O)C)OC(=O)C)C)[C@@]4(C1=CCCC4)C
- InChI: InChI=1S/C24H36O3/c1-15-14-18-20(22(4)11-7-6-8-19(15)22)9-12-23(5)21(18)10-13-24(23,16(2)25)27-17(3)26/h8,15,18,20-21H,6-7,9-14H2,1-5H3/t15-,18+,20-,21-,22-,23-,24-/m0/s1; Key:KDLNOQQQEBKBQM-DICPTYMLSA-N

Anagestone acetate, sold under the brand names Anatropin and Neo-Novum, is a progestin medication which was withdrawn from medical use due to carcinogenicity observed in animal studies.

== Medical uses ==
Anagestone acetate was used in combination with the estrogen mestranol as a combined birth control pill.

== Pharmacology ==
Based on its chemical structure, namely the lack of a C3 ketone, it is probable that anagestone acetate is a prodrug of medroxyprogesterone acetate (the 3-keto analogue).

== Chemistry ==
Anagestone acetate, also known as 3-deketo-6α-methyl-17α-acetoxyprogesterone or as 6α-methyl-17α-acetoxypregn-4-en-20-one, is a synthetic pregnane steroid and a derivative of progesterone and 17α-hydroxyprogesterone. It is the C17α acetate ester of anagestone, which, in contrast to anagestone acetate, was never marketed. Anagestone acetate is closely related structurally to medroxyprogesterone acetate (6α-methyl-17α-acetoxyprogesterone).

== History ==
Anagestone acetate was introduced in combination with mestranol as a birth control pill in 1968 by Ortho Pharmaceutical. It was withdrawn in 1969.

In 1969, along with a variety of other progestogens including progesterone, chlormadinone acetate, megestrol acetate, medroxyprogesterone acetate, ethynerone, and chloroethynyl norgestrel, anagestone acetate was found to induce the development of mammary gland tumors in Beagle dogs after extensive treatment (2–7 years) with very high doses (10–25 times the recommended human dose), though notably not with 1–2 times the human dosage. In contrast, the non-halogenated 19-nortestosterone derivatives norgestrel, norethisterone, noretynodrel, and etynodiol diacetate were not found to produce such nodules. Because of these findings, anagestone acetate was voluntarily withdrawn from the market by the manufacturer in 1969. The findings also led to the virtual disappearance of most 17α-hydroxyprogesterone derivatives as hormonal contraceptives from the market (though medroxyprogesterone acetate, cyproterone acetate, and chlormadinone acetate have continued to be used). According to Hughes et al., "It is still doubtful how much relevance these findings have for humans as the dog mammary gland seems to be the only one which can be directly maintained by progestogens." Subsequent research revealed species differences between dogs and humans and established that there is no similar risk in humans.

== Society and culture ==
=== Generic names ===
Anagestone acetate is the generic name of the drug and its USAN. It is also known by its developmental code name ORF-1658.

=== Brand names ===
Anagestone acetate was marketed under the brand names Anatropin and Neo-Novum, the latter in combination with the estrogen mestranol.

=== Availability ===
Anagestone acetate was withdrawn from the market and is no longer available.

== See also ==
- Acetomepregenol
