= Anagestone =

Chemical compound

Clinical data
- Other names: Anapregnone; 3-Deketo-6α-methyl-17α-hydroxyprogesterone; 6α-Methyl-17α-hydroxypregn-4-en-20-one

Identifiers
- IUPAC name: 1-[(6S,8R,9S,10R,13S,14S,17R)-17-Hydroxy-6,10,13-trimethyl-1,2,3,6,7,8,9,11,12,14,15,16-dodecahydrocyclopenta[a]phenanthren-17-yl]ethanone
- CAS Number: 2740-52-5
- PubChem CID: 160650
- ChemSpider: 141162
- UNII: S8FB38IU3G
- CompTox Dashboard (EPA): DTXSID001043405

Chemical and physical data
- Formula: C_{22}H_{34}O_{2}
- Molar mass: 330.512 g·mol^{−1}
- 3D model (JSmol): Interactive image
- SMILES: CC1CC2C(CCC3(C2CCC3(C(=O)C)O)C)C4(C1=CCCC4)C
- InChI: InChI=1S/C22H34O2/c1-14-13-16-18(20(3)10-6-5-7-17(14)20)8-11-21(4)19(16)9-12-22(21,24)15(2)23/h7,14,16,18-19,24H,5-6,8-13H2,1-4H3/t14-,16+,18-,19-,20-,21-,22-/m0/s1; Key:GAIHSQSRHYQICG-DACBVQKSSA-N

Anagestone (INN), also known as 3-deketo-6α-methyl-17α-hydroxyprogesterone or as 6α-methyl-17α-hydroxypregn-4-en-20-one, is a progestin which was never marketed.

An acylated derivative, anagestone acetate, was formerly used clinically as a pharmaceutical drug.

While anagestone is sometimes used as a synonym for anagestone acetate, it usually refers to anagestone acetate, not anagestone.
