= Menstrual suppression =

Treatments to reduce menstrual bleeding

Menstrual suppression refers to the practice of using hormonal management to stop or reduce menstrual bleeding. In contrast to surgical options for this purpose, such as hysterectomy or endometrial ablation, hormonal methods to manipulate menstruation are reversible.

There are a number of medical conditions for which fewer menstrual periods and less blood loss may be beneficial. In addition, suppression of hormonal cyclicity may benefit menstrual-related mood swings or other conditions which increase in frequency with menses. Management of menstruation may be a challenge for those with developmental delay or intellectual disability, and menstrual suppression can benefit individuals with specific job- or activity-related needs. There is increasing attention being given to menstrual suppression for transgender men and non-binary transmasculine people who may experience dysphoria with menstruation. Menstrual suppression is also being used by individuals with a variety of personal reasons to have less frequent or no menses, such as travel reasons or simply to avoid the pain, discomfort, and inconvenience of menstruation.

Options for menstrual suppression include hormonal medications like extended cycle combined hormonal contraceptive pills, progestogen-only contraceptives (including progestogen-only pills, progestogen-containing implants, progestogen-containing intrauterine devices, and progestogen-only injectable contraceptives), gonadotropin-releasing hormone modulators, and testosterone, as well as the surgical options of hysterectomy (removal of the uterus) and endometrial ablation (removal of the endometrium). Most options for the suppression of menstrual bleeding are not immediately 100% effective, and with many options, unscheduled bleeding (termed "breakthrough bleeding") can occur; for many options for menstrual suppression, breakthrough bleeding becomes less frequent with time.

== Medical uses ==
Hormonal therapies to reduce or stop menstrual bleeding have long been used to manage a number of gynecologic conditions including menstrual cramps (dysmenorrhea), heavy menstrual bleeding, irregular or other abnormal uterine bleeding, menstrual-related mood changes (premenstrual syndrome or premenstrual dysphoric disorder), and pelvic pain due to endometriosis or uterine fibroids. Medical conditions that are associated with anemia or excessive blood loss, including sickle cell disease, iron deficiency anemia, Fanconi anemia, von Willebrand disease, low platelets (thrombocytopenia) from immune thrombocytopenia, or other blood/hematologic disorders such as clotting factor deficiencies could all benefit from menstrual suppression. In patients with malignancies who will receive chemotherapy that could result in low blood counts or anemia, or individuals with recurrent malignancies who will receive a stem cell transplant, excessive menstrual bleeding during this treatment could be medically serious, and thus menstrual suppression might be indicated. In addition, there are a number of other medical conditions with menstrual exacerbation that may benefit from menstrual suppression, including catamenial seizures, menstrual migraine headaches, irritable bowel syndrome, and asthma.

Menstrual hygiene issues, as in those individuals with developmental delay or intellectual disability or other manual dexterity or mobility/wheelchair challenges such as spina bifida or cerebral palsy may prompt an individual or caregiver to request menstrual suppression. Job- or activity-related indications for menstrual suppression may include deployed military as occurred during Operation Desert Storm, travel, wilderness camping, astronauts, or athletes with concerns about menses occurring during competition or training. There is also a growing recognition that transgender men and non-binary transmasculine people may experience dysphoria with menses, and thus may request medical therapy for menstrual suppression.

== Contraindications ==
The use of hormonal methods containing estrogen (combined oral contraceptives, the contraceptive patch or contraceptive ring), may be associated with risks that outweigh benefits for individuals with specific medical problems, such as migraine headaches with aura, a history of breast cancer, or a history of deep vein thrombosis. Thus these options would be contraindicated for menstrual suppression with such conditions. Progestin-only options (depot medroxyprogesterone acetate, oral progestins) are appropriate for these individuals. Drug-drug interactions are also important to consider, particularly with combined hormonal options.

== Safety ==
As extended cycle regimens of combined hormonal contraceptives provide a greater cumulative dose of steroid hormones, questions have been raised about their safety. Data currently provide reassurance that these options are safe.

== Options ==
While some forms of birth control do not affect the menstrual cycle, hormonal contraceptives work by disrupting it. Progestogen negative feedback decreases the pulse frequency of gonadotropin-releasing hormone (GnRH) release by the hypothalamus, which decreases the release of follicle-stimulating hormone (FSH) and luteinizing hormone (LH) by the anterior pituitary. Decreased levels of FSH inhibit follicular development, preventing an increase in estradiol levels. Progestogen negative feedback and the lack of estrogen positive feedback on LH release prevent a mid-cycle LH surge. Inhibition of follicular development and the absence of an LH surge prevent ovulation.

=== Combined hormonal contraceptives ===
The use of combined hormonal contraceptives such as the pill, the patch, and the vaginal ring are methods of contraception that contain both an estrogen and progestogen. These methods have traditionally been used in a cyclic fashion, with three weeks (21 days) of hormones, followed by a 7-day hormone-free interval (with combined oral contraceptives, often with a week of placebo pills) during which time withdrawal bleeding or a hormonally-induced menstrual period occurs, mimicking an idealized spontaneous menstrual cycle. When these methods are taken without the hormone-free week, the withdrawal bleeding is reduced or eliminated. Thus extended cycle combined hormonal contraceptive pills are commonly used for menstrual suppression, although breakthrough bleeding is common in the initial months of use. The rate of amenorrhea (no bleeding) is in the range of 60% for users who are continuing to use combined hormonal contraceptive pills at the end of a year.

Combined hormonal contraceptives include both an estrogen and a progestogen. Estrogen negative feedback on the anterior pituitary greatly decreases the release of FSH, which makes combined hormonal contraceptives more effective at inhibiting follicular development and preventing ovulation. Estrogen also reduces the incidence of irregular breakthrough bleeding. Several combined hormonal contraceptives—the pill, vaginal ring, and contraceptive patch—are usually used in a way that causes regular withdrawal bleeding. In a normal cycle, menstruation occurs when estrogen and progesterone levels drop rapidly. Temporarily discontinuing use of combined hormonal contraceptives (a placebo week, not using patch or ring for a week) has a similar effect of causing the uterine lining to shed. If withdrawal bleeding is not desired, combined hormonal contraceptives may be taken continuously, although this increases the risk of breakthrough bleeding.

=== Progestogen-only contraceptives ===
Progestogen-only medications, including progestogen-only pills and a slow-release (depot) injectable medication, depot medroxyprogesterone acetate (DMPA; Depo-Provera) do not contain an estrogen. DMPA is given as an injection every 90 days, and is typically associated with amenorrhea in about 50 to 60% of users at the end of one year. Progestogens that are not typically used for birth control, such as norethisterone acetate, may be used to induce amenorrhea.

The degree of ovulation suppression in progestogen-only contraceptives depends on the progestogenic activity and dose of the formulation used. Low-dose progestogen-only contraceptives, including traditional progestogen-only pills (e.g., norethisterone (Micronor, Nor-QD, Noriday)), levonorgestrel-releasing implants (Norplant, Jadelle), and hormonal intrauterine devices (IUDs) (e.g., levonorgestrel (Mirena)), inhibit ovulation in about 50% of cycles and rely mainly on other effects, such as thickening of cervical mucus, for their contraceptive effectiveness. Intermediate-dose progestogen-only contraceptives, including the progestogen-only pill desogestrel (Cerazette) and the subdermal implant etonogestrel (Nexplanon, Implanon), allow some follicular development but more consistently inhibit ovulation in 97 to 99% of cycles. The same cervical mucus changes occur as with very low-dose progestogens. High-dose progestogen-only contraceptives—the injectables DMPA (Depo-Provera) and norethisterone enanthate (Noristerat)—completely inhibit follicular development and ovulation.

Injections such as DMPA became available in the 1960s and later became used to also achieve amenorrhea. A majority of patients will achieve amenorrhea within 1 year of initiating DMPA therapy. DMPA therapy is typically successful in achieving amenorrhea but also has side effects of decreased bone mineral density that must be considered before beginning therapy.

When using the subdermal progestogen-only implants, unpredictable bleeding continues and amenorrhea is not commonly achieved amongst patients. Progestogen-only contraceptive pills (sometimes called the "mini pill") are taken continuously without a 7-day span of using placebo pills, and therefore menstrual periods are less likely to occur than with the combined pill with placebo pills. However, disturbance of the menstrual cycle is common with the mini-pill; one-third to one-half of women taking it will experience prolonged periods, and up to 70% experience break-through bleeding (metrorrhagia). Irregular and prolonged bleeding is the most common reason that women discontinue using the mini pill.

Hormonal IUDs containing the progestogen levonorgestrel have the side effect of inducing amenorrhea, and some types of IUDs have been shown to markedly decrease menstrual blood loss, and thus are efficacious in treating heavy and abnormal menstrual bleeding. The rate of amenorrhea after one year of use is in the range of 20 to 50%, although most users of the hormonal IUDs Mirena and Liletta experience a marked decrease in menstrual bleeding, which is beneficial and has led to reported high rates of user satisfaction.

Levonorgestrel IUDs have also been used been shown to induce amenorrhea. The lower dose device has a lower rate of achieving amenorrhea compared to the higher dose device where 50% of users have been found to achieve amenorrhea within 1 year of use. A concern for usage of these devices is the invasive administration and initial breakthrough bleeding while utilizing these devices however they have the advantage of the most infrequent dosing schedule of every 5 years. Use of IUDs have also shown to reduce menorrhagia and dysmenorrhea.

=== Others ===
Gonadotropin-releasing hormone (GnRH) modulators, including both GnRH agonists and GnRH antagonists, are associated with amenorrhea, and have been used to induce therapeutic amenorrhea. Among oncologists caring for adolescents with cancer, GnRH modulators were the most commonly recommended treatment for menstrual suppression to prevent or treat heavy bleeding during therapy.

The hormonal agent danazol (Danocrine) was once used for the treatment of endometriosis, and was associated with amenorrhea, but its use was limited by androgenic side effects such as the potential for permanent lowering of the voice or hair growth. As these side effects may be desired in transgender men and non-binary transmasculine people, there has been some consideration of this option for menstrual population in this group of individuals.

Testosterone and its esters are effective as a form of menstrual suppression and help to suppress menstruation in transgender men and non-binary transmasculine people. Testosterone is not used in cisgender women due to its masculinizing effects at required doses. Other anabolic–androgenic steroids, such as nandrolone and oxandrolone, may also produce menstrual suppression at sufficiently high doses.

== History ==
Historically, women and girls had far fewer menstrual periods throughout their lifetimes, a result of shorter life expectancies, as well as a greater length of time spent pregnant or breast-feeding, which reduced the number of periods they experienced.

When the first birth control pill was being developed, the researchers were aware that they could use the contraceptive to space menstrual periods up to 90 days apart, but they settled on a 28-day cycle that would mimic a natural menstrual cycle and produce monthly periods. The intention behind this decision was the hope of the inventor, John Rock, to win approval for his invention from the Roman Catholic Church. That attempt failed, but the 28-day cycle remained the standard when the pill became available to the public.

Historically, the concept that menstruation did not have beneficial effects, and that menstruation could be controlled was raised in the 1990s, by Dr. Elsimar Coutinho. The English language version, title, "Is Menstruation Obsolete: How suppressing menstruation can help women who suffer from anemia, endometriosis, or PMS?" was published in 1999.
