= List of progestogens available in the United States =

This is a list of progestogens (progesterone and progestins) and formulations that are approved by the FDA in the United States. Progestogens are used as hormonal contraceptives, in hormone replacement therapy for menopausal symptoms, and in the treatment of gynecological disorders.

== For contraception ==
=== Combined contraceptives ===
==== Combined oral contraceptive pills ====
- Drospirenone and Estetrol (Nextstellis)
- Estradiol valerate and dienogest (Natazia)
- Ethinylestradiol and desogestrel (Bekyree, Cyclessa, Desogen, Emoquette, Enskyce, Isibloom, Kariva, Kimidess, Mircette, Ortho-Cept, Pimtrea, Velivet, Viorele, Volnea)
- Ethinylestradiol and drospirenone [and/or levomefolate calcium] (Beyaz, Loryna, Melamisa, Nikki, Safyral, Syeda, Yaela, Yasmin, Yaz)
- Ethinylestradiol and etynodiol diacetate (Demulen 1/35-21, Demulen 1/35-28, Demulen 1/50-21, Demulen 1/50-28, Kelnor, Zovia 1/35E-21, Zovia 1/35E-28, Zovia 1/50E-21, Zovia 1/50E-28)
- Ethinylestradiol and levonorgestrel (Alesse, Altavera, Ashlyna, Aviane-21, Aviane-28, Ayuna, Daysee, Elifemme, Enpresse-21, Enpresse-28, Falmina, Fayosim, Introvale, Kurvelo, Lessina-21, Lessina-28, Levlite, Levonest, Levonorgestrel and Ethinyl Estradiol, Levora 0.15/30-21, Levora 0.15/30-28, LoSeasonique, Lybrel, Marlissa, Myzilra, Nordette-21, Nordette-28, Orsythia, Portia-21, Portia-28, Preven Emergency Contraceptive Kit, Quartette, Quasense, Seasonale, Seasonique, Setlakin, Triphasil-21, Triphasil-28, Trivora-21, Trivora-28, Vienva)
- Ethinylestradiol and norethisterone [and/or ferrous fumarate (Fe)] (Alyacen 1/35, Alyacen 7/7/7, Alyacen 777, Aranelle, Balziva-21, Balziva-28, Brevicon 21-Day, Brevicon 28-Day, Briellyn, Cyclafem 0.5/35, Cyclafem 1/35, Cyclafem 7/7/7, Dasetta 1/35, Dasetta 7/7/7, Femcon Fe, Gencept 10/11-21, Gencept 10/11-28, Gildagia, Kaitlib Fe, Modicon 21, Modicon 28, N.E.E. 1/35 21, N.E.E. 1/35 28, Norcept-E 1/35 21, Norcept-E 1/35 28, Norethin 1/35E-21, Norethin 1/35E-28, Norinyl 1+35 21-Day, Norinyl 1+35 28-Day, Norquest Fe, Nortrel 0.5/35-21, Nortrel 0.5/35-28, Nortrel 1/35-21, Nortrel 1/35-28, Nortrel 7/7/7, Ortho-Novum 1/35-21, Ortho-Novum 1/35-28, Ortho-Novum 10/11-21, Ortho-Novum 10/11-28, Ortho-Novum 7/14-21, Ortho-Novum 7/14-28, Ortho-Novum 7/7/7-21, Ortho-Novum 7/7/7-28, Ovcon-35, Ovcon-50, Philith, Pirmella 1/35, Pirmella 7/7/7, Tri-Norinyl 21-Day, Tri-Norinyl 28-Day, Vyfemla, Wera)
- Ethinylestradiol and norethisterone acetate [and/or ferrous fumarate (Fe)] (Activella, Alyacen 1/35, Alyacen 7/7/7, Alyacen 777, Amabelz, Aranelle, Aurovela 1.5/30, Aurovela 1/20, Aurovela 24 Fe, Aurovela Fe 1.5/30, Aurovela Fe 1/20, Aurovela Fe, Aygestin, Balziva-21, Balziva-28, Blisovi 24 Fe, Blisovi Fe 1.5/30, Blisovi Fe 1/20, Brevicon 21-Day, Brevicon 28-Day, Briellyn, Camila, Chabelina Fe, Charlotte 24 Fe, Combipatch, Cyclafem 0.5/35, Cyclafem 1/35, Cyclafem 7/7/7, Cyonanz, Dasetta 1/35, Dasetta 7/7/7, Errin, Estrostep 21, Estrostep Fe, Femcon Fe, Femhrt, Finzala, Fyavolv, Gemmily, Gencept 10/11-21, Gencept 10/11-28, Gildagia, Gildess 1.5/30, Gildess 1/20, Gildess 24 Fe, Gildess Fe 1.5/30, Gildess Fe 1/20, Hailey 1.5/30, Hailey 24 Fe, Hailey Fe 1.5/30, Hailey Fe 1/20, Heather, Incassia, Jencycla, Jinteli, Junel 1.5/30, Junel 1/20, Junel 21, Junel Fe 1.5/30, Junel Fe 1/20, Junel Fe 24, Junel Fe 28, Kaitlib Fe, Larin 1.5/30, Larin 1/20, Larin 24 Fe, Larin Fe 1.5/30, Larin Fe 1/20, Leribane, Lo Larin Fe, Lo Loestrin Fe, Lo Minastrin Fe, Lo-Blisovi Fe, Loestrin 21 1.5/30, Loestrin 21 1/20, Loestrin 21, Loestrin 24 Fe, Loestrin Fe 1.5/30, Loestrin Fe 1/20, Loestrin Fe 28, Lomedia 24 Fe, Lupaneta Pack, Melodetta 24 Fe, Merzee, Mibelas 24 Fe, Microgestin 1.5/30, Microgestin 1/20, Microgestin Fe 1.5/30, Microgestin Fe 1/20, Micronor, Minastrin 24 Fe, Modicon 21, Modicon 28, Myfembree, N.E.E. 1/35 21, N.E.E. 1/35 28, Nexesta Fe, Nor-Qd, Norcept-E 1/35 21, Norcept-E 1/35 28, Norethin 1/35E-21, Norethin 1/35E-28, Norethin 1/50M-21, Norethin 1/50M-28, Norinyl, Norinyl 1+35 21-Day, Norinyl 1+35 28-Day, Norinyl 1+50 21-Day, Norinyl 1+50 28-Day, Norinyl 1+80 21-Day, Norinyl 1+80 28-Day, Norlestrin 21 1/50, Norlestrin 21 2.5/50, Norlestrin 28 1/50, Norlestrin Fe 1/50, Norlestrin Fe 2.5/50, Norlutate, Norlutin, Norminest Fe, Norquest Fe, Nortrel 0.5/35-21, Nortrel 0.5/35-28, Nortrel 1/35-21, Nortrel 1/35-28, Nortrel 7/7/7, Nylia 1/35, Nylia 7/7/7, Oriahnn (Copackaged), Ortho-Novum 1/35-21, Ortho-Novum 1/35-28, Ortho-Novum 1/50 21, Ortho-Novum 1/50 28, Ortho-Novum 1/80 21, Ortho-Novum 1/80 28, Ortho-Novum 2-21, Ortho-Novum 7/7/7-21, Ortho-Novum 7/7/7-28, Ortho-Novum 7/14-21, Ortho-Novum 7/14-28, Ortho-Novum 10-21, Ortho-Novum 10/11-21, Ortho-Novum 10/11-28, Ovcon-35, Ovcon-50, Philith, Pirmella 1/35, Pirmella 7/7/7, Taytulla, Tri-Legest 21, Tri-Legest 21, Tri-Legest Fe, Tri-Norinyl 21-Day, Tri-Norinyl 28-Day, Vyfemla, Wera)
- Ethinylestradiol and norgestimate (Estarylla, Mili, Mono-Linyah, Ortho Cyclen-21, Ortho Cyclen-28, Ortho Tri-Cyclen, Ortho Tri-Cyclen 21, Ortho Tri-Cyclen 28, Ortho Tri-Cyclen Lo, Previfem, Sprintec, Tri Lo Sprintec, Tri-Estarylla, Tri-Linyah, Tri-Lo-Estarylla, Tri-Lo-Linyah, Tri-Mili, Tri-Previfem, Tri-Sprintec)
- Ethinylestradiol and norgestrel (Cryselle, Elinest, Lo/Ovral, Lo/Ovral-28, Low-Ogestrel-21, Low-Ogestrel-28, Ogestrel 0.5/50-21, Ogestrel 0.5/50-28, Ovral, Ovral-28)
- Mestranol and norethisterone (Norinyl 1+50 28-Day)

==== Transdermal patches ====
- Ethinylestradiol and norelgestromin (Ortho Evra, Xulane)

==== Vaginal rings ====
- Ethinylestradiol and etonogestrel (NuvaRing)
- Ethinylestradiol and segesterone acetate (Annovera)

==== Combined injectable contraceptives ====
Estradiol cypionate and medroxyprogesterone acetate (Lunelle; 5 mg / 25 mg) was previously available in the U.S. but was discontinued.

=== Progestogen-only contraceptives ===
==== Progestogen-only pills ====
- Drospirenone (Slynd) – 4 mg (available as of 2019)
- Norethisterone (Camila, Errin, Heather, Incassia, Jencycla, Micronor, Nor-QD) – 0.35 mg
- Norgestrel (Opill) – 0.075 mg (available over-the-counter as of 2023)

Norgestrel (Ovrette; 0.075 mg) was also previously available in the U.S. as a prescription, but was discontinued in 2005 due to "marketing reasons".

==== Postcoital emergency contraceptive pills ====
- Levonorgestrel (Athentia Next, Fallback Solo, Her Style, Opcicon One-Step, Plan B, Plan B One-Step) – 0.75 mg, 1.5 mg

==== Progestogen-only injectable contraceptives ====
- Medroxyprogesterone acetate (Depo-Provera) – 150 mg/mL (intramuscular)
- Medroxyprogesterone acetate (Depo-SubQ Provera 104) – 104 mg/0.65 mL (subcutaneous)

==== Intrauterine devices ====
- Levonorgestrel (Kyleena, Liletta, Mirena, Skyla) – 13.5 mg/device, 19.5 mg/device, 52 mg/device

Progesterone (Progestasert; 38 mg/device) was previously available in the U.S. but was discontinued.

==== Subcutaneous implants ====
- Etonogestrel (Implanon, Nexplanon) – 68 mg/implant
- Levonorgestrel (Jadelle, Norplant, Norplant System in Plastic Container) – 36 mg/implant, 75 mg/implant

== For other uses ==
=== Combined with estrogen ===
==== Oral pills ====
- Conjugated estrogens and medroxyprogesterone acetate (Premphase (Premarin, Cycrin 14/14), Premphase 14/14, Prempro, Prempro (Premarin, Cycrin), Prempro/Premphase) – 0.3 mg / 1.5 mg; 0.45 mg / 1.5 mg; 0.625 mg / 2.5 mg; 0.625 mg / 5 mg
- Estradiol and drospirenone (Angeliq) – 0.5 mg / 0.25 mg; 1 mg / 0.5 mg
- Estradiol and norethisterone acetate (Activella, Amabelz) – 1 mg / 0.5 mg; 0.5 mg / 0.1 mg
- Ethinylestradiol and norethisterone acetate (FemHRT) – 25 μg / 0.5 mg

Estradiol/progesterone (TX-001HR), a combination of estradiol and progesterone in oil-filled capsules, is currently pending approval.

Estradiol and norgestimate (Prefest; 1 mg / 90 μg) was previously available in the U.S. but was discontinued.

==== Transdermal patches ====
- Estradiol and levonorgestrel (Climara Pro) – 45 μg/24 hours / 15 μg/24 hours
- Estradiol and norethisterone acetate (Combipatch) – 50 μg/24 hours / 0.14 mg/24 hours; 50 μg/24 hours / 0.25 mg/24 hours

=== Progestogen-only ===
==== Oral pills ====
- Medroxyprogesterone acetate (Amen, Curretab, Cycrin, Provera) – 2.5 mg, 5 mg, 10 mg
- Megestrol acetate (Megace) – 20 mg, 40 mg – approved specifically for the treatment of breast and endometrial cancer and for the treatment of anorexia, cachexia, and weight loss in patients with AIDS
- Norethisterone acetate (Aygestin, Norlutate) – 5 mg
- Progesterone (Prometrium) – 100 mg, 200 mg, 300 mg

Atypical:

- Danazol (Danocrine) – 50 mg, 100 mg, 200 mg – approved specifically for the treatment of endometriosis

==== Oral suspensions ====
- Megestrol acetate (Megace, Megace ES) – 40 mg/mL, 125 mg/mL – approved specifically for the treatment of anorexia, cachexia, and weight loss in patients with AIDS

==== Vaginal tablets ====
- Progesterone (Endometrin) – 100 mg

==== Vaginal gels ====
- Progesterone (Crinone) – 4%, 8%

==== Intramuscular injectables ====
- Hydroxyprogesterone caproate (Delalutin, Makena, Makena Preservative Free) – 125 mg/mL, 250 mg/mL
- Medroxyprogesterone acetate (Depo-Provera) – 400 mg/mL – approved specifically for the treatment of endometrial/renal cancer
- Progesterone (Progesterone) – 50 mg/mL (25 mg/mL discontinued)

=== Miscellaneous ===
- Norethisterone acetate and leuprorelin (Lupaneta Pack) – 5 mg norethisterone acetate oral pills, 3.75 mg/vial, 11.25 mg/vial leuprorelin for intramuscular injection – approved specifically for the treatment of painful endometriosis

== Not available in the United States ==
- Acetomepregenol
- Algestone acetophenide
- Allylestrenol
- Chlormadinone acetate
- Cyproterone acetate
- Demegestone
- Dimethisterone
- Dydrogesterone
- Ethisterone
- Gestodene
- Gestonorone caproate
- Gestrinone
- Haloprogesterone
- Hydroxyprogesterone acetate
- Hydroxyprogesterone heptanoate
- Lynestrenol
- Medrogestone
- Nomegestrol acetate
- Norethisterone enanthate
- Noretynodrel
- Norgesterone
- Norgestrienone
- Normethandrone
- Norvinisterone
- Oxendolone
- Pentagestrone acetate
- Promegestone
- Quingestanol acetate
- Quingestrone
- Segesterone acetate
- Tibolone
- Trengestone
- Trimegestone

== See also ==
- List of sex-hormonal medications available in the United States
- List of progestogens
- List of progestogen esters
- Oral contraceptive formulations
- Estradiol-containing oral contraceptive
