= Haberlandt =

Haberlandt is a surname. Notable people with the surname include:

- Friedrich J. Haberlandt (1826–1878), Austro-Hungarian scientist
- Fritzi Haberlandt (born 1975), German actress
- Gottlieb Haberlandt (1854–1945), Austrian botanist
- Ludwig Haberlandt (1885–1932), Austrian scientist
