= C21H28O3 =

The molecular formula C_{21}H_{28}O_{3} may refer to:

- Estradiol monopropionate
- Estradiol 3-propionate
- HU-331
- HU-336
- 6-Ketoprogesterone
- 11-Ketoprogesterone
- Nomegestrol
- Pyrethrin I
- SC-8109
- Segesterone
