= Segesterone acetate/ethinylestradiol =

Combination hormonal birth control

- Ethinylestradiol (top) and segesterone acetate (bottom)

Combination of
- Segesterone acetate: Progestogen
- Ethinylestradiol: Estrogen

Clinical data
- Trade names: Annovera
- Other names: EE/SGA; EE/SA
- AHFS/Drugs.com: Professional Drug Facts
- MedlinePlus: a604032
- License data: US DailyMed: Segesterone acetate and ethinyl estradiol
- Routes of administration: Intravaginal
- ATC code: None

Legal status
- Legal status: CA: ℞-only; US: ℞-only

Identifiers
- KEGG: D11654

Segesterone acetate/ethinylestradiol (EE/SGA), sold under the brand name Annovera among others, is a contraceptive vaginal ring and combined form of hormonal birth control which contains segesterone acetate, a progestin; and ethinylestradiol, an estrogen. It contains 17.4 mg ethinylestradiol and 103 mg segesterone acetate, releases an average of 13 μg ethinylestradiol and 0.15 mg segesterone acetate per day.

The ring is inserted into the vagina and left for 21 days, then removed, washed and stored for seven days, during which the user experiences a period (withdrawal bleeding.) This can be repeated thirteen times, for one full year of use. Unlike NuvaRing, another vaginal ring contraceptive, the combination ring does not need to be refrigerated before being dispensed and can be stored at room temperature up to 30 degrees Celsius.

The medication was developed by the Population Council, an international non-profit organization, and licensed to TherapeuticsMD. It was approved for medical use in the United States in August 2018, and in Canada in December 2024.

== See also ==
- Combined injectable birth control § Available forms
- List of combined sex-hormonal preparations
