= Hormonal contraception =

Birth control methods that act on the endocrine system

Background
- Type: Hormonal
- First use: 1960

Pregnancy rates (first year)
- Perfect use: Varies by method: 0.05-2%
- Typical use: Varies by method: 0.05-9%

Usage
- Duration effect: Various
- Reversibility: Upon discontinuation
- User reminders: Must follow usage schedule
- Clinic review: Every 3–12 months, depending on method

Advantages and disadvantages
- STI protection: No
- Periods: Withdrawal bleeds are frequently lighter than menstrual periods, and some methods can suppress bleeding altogether
- Weight: No proven effect

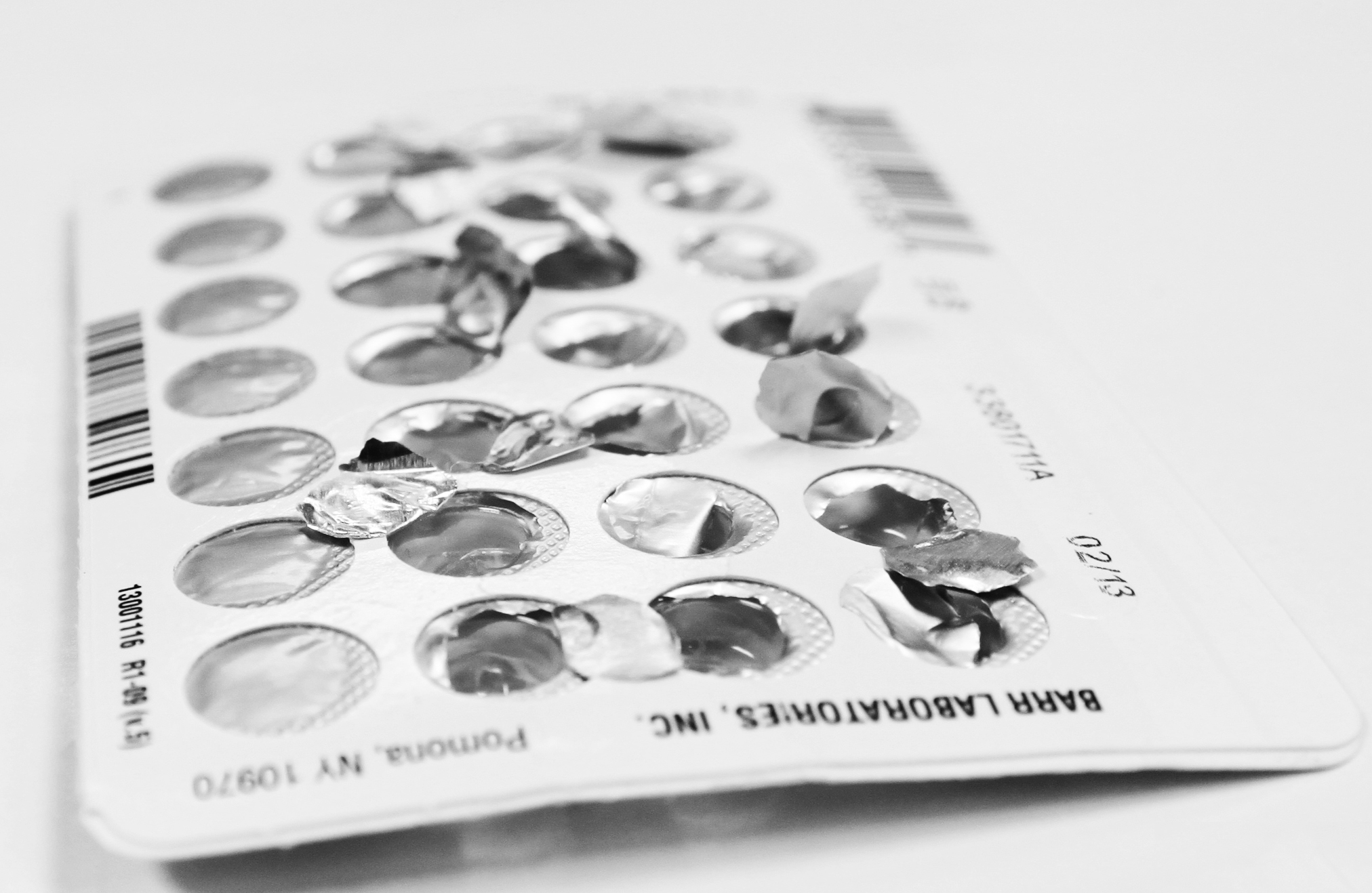
Oral birth control

Hormonal contraception refers to birth control methods that act on the endocrine system. Almost all methods are composed of steroid hormones, although in India one selective estrogen receptor modulator is marketed as a contraceptive. The original hormonal method—the combined oral contraceptive pill—was first marketed as a contraceptive in 1960. In the ensuing decades, many other delivery methods have been developed. The oral and injectable methods are by far the most popular. Hormonal contraception is highly effective: when taken on the prescribed schedule, users of steroid hormone methods experience pregnancy rates of less than 1% per year. Perfect-use pregnancy rates for most hormonal contraceptives are usually around the 0.3% rate or less. Currently available methods can only be used by women; the development of a male hormonal contraceptive is an active research area.

There are two main types of hormonal contraceptive formulations: combined methods which contain both an estrogen and a progestin, and progestogen-only methods which contain only progesterone or one of its synthetic analogues (progestins). Combined methods work by suppressing ovulation and thickening cervical mucus; while progestogen-only methods reduce the frequency of ovulation, most rely more heavily on changes in cervical mucus. The incidence of certain side effects differs among formulations: for example, breakthrough bleeding is much more common with progestogen-only methods. Certain serious complications occasionally caused by estrogen-containing contraceptives are not believed to be caused by progestogen-only formulations: deep vein thrombosis is one example of this.

== Medical uses ==
Hormonal contraception is primarily used for the prevention of pregnancy, but is also prescribed for the treatment of polyendocrine metabolic ovarian syndrome (PMOS), menstrual disorders such as dysmenorrhea and menorrhagia, and hirsutism.

=== Polyendocrine metabolic ovarian syndrome (PMOS) ===
Hormonal treatments, such as hormonal contraceptives, are frequently successful at alleviating symptoms associated with polyendocrine metabolic ovarian syndrome (PMOS). Birth control pills are often prescribed to reverse the effects of excessive androgen levels, and decrease ovarian hormone production.

=== Dysmenorrhea ===
Hormonal birth control methods such as birth control pills, the contraceptive patch, vaginal ring, contraceptive implant, and hormonal IUD are used to treat cramping and pain associated with primary dysmenorrhea.

=== Menorrhagia ===
Oral contraceptives are prescribed in the treatment of menorrhagia to help regulate menstrual cycles and prevent prolonged menstrual bleeding. The hormonal IUD (Mirena) releases levonorgestrel, which thins the uterine lining, preventing excessive bleeding and loss of iron.

=== Hirsutism ===
Birth control pills are the most commonly prescribed hormonal treatment for hirsutism, as they prevent ovulation and decrease androgen production by the ovaries. Additionally, estrogen in the pills stimulates the liver to produce more of a protein that binds to androgens and reduces their activity.

=== Effectiveness ===
Modern contraceptives using steroid hormones have perfect-use or method failure rates of less than 1% per year. The lowest failure rates are seen with the implants Jadelle and Implanon, at 0.05% per year. According to Contraceptive Technology, none of these methods has a failure rate greater than 0.3% per year. The SERM ormeloxifene is less effective than the steroid hormone methods; studies have found a perfect-use failure rate near 2% per year.

Long-acting methods such as the implant and the IUS are user-independent methods. For user-independent methods, the typical or actual-use failure rates are the same as the method failure rates. Methods that require regular action by the user—such as taking a pill every day—have typical failure rates higher than perfect-use failure rates. Contraceptive Technology reports a typical failure rate of 3% per year for the injection Depo-Provera, and 8% per year for most other user-dependent hormonal methods. While no large studies have been done, it is hoped that newer methods, which require less frequent action (such as the patch), will result in higher user compliance and therefore lower typical failure rates.

Currently, there is little evidence that there is an association between being overweight and the effectiveness of hormonal contraceptives.

=== Combined vs. progestogen-only ===
While unpredictable breakthrough bleeding is a possible side effect for all hormonal contraceptives, it is more common with progestogen-only formulations. Most regimens of COCPs, NuvaRing, and the contraceptive patch incorporate a placebo or break week that causes regular withdrawal bleeding. While women using combined injectable contraceptives may experience amenorrhea (lack of periods), they typically have predictable bleeding comparable to that of women using COCPs.

Although high-quality studies are lacking, it is believed that estrogen-containing contraceptives significantly decrease the quantity of milk in breastfeeding women. Progestogen-only contraceptives are not believed to have this effect. In addition, while in general the progestogen-only pill is less effective than other hormonal contraceptives, the added contraceptive effect of breastfeeding makes it highly effective in breastfeeding women.

While combined contraceptives increase the risk for deep vein thrombosis (DVT – blood clots), progestogen-only contraceptives are not believed to affect DVT formation.

== Side effects ==
=== Cancers ===
- There is a mixed effect of combined hormonal contraceptives on the rates of various cancers, with the International Agency for Research on Cancer (IARC) stating: "It was concluded that, if the reported association was causal, the excess risk for breast cancer associated with typical patterns of current use of combined oral contraceptives was very small." and also saying that "there is also conclusive evidence that these agents have a protective effect against cancers of the ovary and endometrium":
- The (IARC) notes that "the weight of the evidence suggests a small increase in the relative risk for breast cancer among current and recent users" which following discontinuation then lessens over a period of 10 years to similar rates as women who never used them, as well as "The increase in risk for breast cancer associated with the use of combined oral contraceptives in younger women could be due to more frequent contacts with doctors"
- Small increases are also seen in the rates of cervical cancer and hepatocellular (liver) tumours.
- Endometrial and ovarian cancer risks are approximately halved and persists for at least 10 years after cessation of use; "sequential oral contraceptives, which were removed from the consumer market in the 1970s, were associated with an increased risk for endometrial cancer".
- Studies have overall not shown effects on the relative risks for colorectal, melanoma, or thyroid cancers.
- Information on progesterone-only pills is less extensive, due to smaller sampling sizes, but they do not appear to increase the risk of breast cancer significantly.
- Most other forms of hormonal contraception are too new for meaningful data to be available, although risks and benefits are believed to be similar for methods that use the same hormones; e.g., risks for combined-hormone patches are thought to be roughly equivalent to those for combined-hormone pills.

=== Cardiovascular disease ===
Combined oral contraceptives can increase the risk of certain types of cardiovascular disease in women with a pre-existing condition or already heightened risk of cardiovascular disease. Smoking (for women over 35), metabolic conditions like diabetes, obesity, and a family history of heart disease are all risk factors that may be exacerbated by the use of certain hormonal contraceptives. Oral contraceptives have also been linked to an inflated risk of myocardial infarction, arterial thrombosis, and ischemic stroke.

=== Blood clots ===
Hormonal contraception methods are consistently linked with the risk of developing blood clots. However, the risk does vary depending on the hormone type or birth control method being used.

=== Emotional well-being ===
Hormonal Contraceptives have not been consistently shown to affect emotional well-being negatively. Most research suggests that users do not experience meaningful changes in mood. This is true even in studies that find measurable differences in neural indicators of emotion. Some studies suggest that hormonal contraceptives may have small effects on specific aspects of well-being and that individuals who are particularly sensitive to hormonal fluctuations could be at increased risk for mood-related side effects. However, findings in this field remain inconsistent. Much of this inconsistency is due to methodological challenges, including variability in natural hormonal fluctuations across the menstrual cycle and differences in menstrual cycle phase at testing. These factors make it difficult to compare between hormonal contraceptive users and naturally cycling individuals.

== Types ==
There are two main classes of hormonal contraceptives: combined contraceptives contain both an estrogen and a progestin, and progestogen-only contraceptives that contain only progesterone or a synthetic analogue (progestin). There is also a non-hormonal contraceptive called ormeloxifene which acts on the hormonal system to prevent pregnancy.

=== Combined ===
The most popular form of hormonal contraception is the combined oral contraceptive pill (COCP) known colloquially as the pill. It is taken once a day, most commonly for 21 days followed by a seven-day break, although other regimens are also used. For women not using ongoing hormonal contraception, COCPs may be taken after intercourse as emergency contraception: this is known as the Yuzpe regimen. COCPs are available in a variety of formulations.

The contraceptive patch is applied to the skin and worn continuously. A series of three patches is worn for one week each, and then the user takes a one-week break. NuvaRing is worn inside the vagina. A ring is worn for three weeks. After removal, the user takes a one-week break before inserting a new ring. As with COCPs, other regimens may be used with the contraceptive patch or NuvaRing to provide extended cycle combined hormonal contraception.

Some combined injectable contraceptives can be administered as one injection per month.

=== Progestogen-only ===
The progestogen-only pill (POP) is taken once per day within the same three-hour window. Several different formulations of POP are marketed. A low-dose formulation is known as the minipill. Unlike COCPs, progestogen-only pills are taken every day with no breaks or placebos. For women not using ongoing hormonal contraception, progestogen-only pills may be taken after intercourse as emergency contraception. There are several dedicated products sold for this purpose.

Hormonal intrauterine contraceptives are known as intrauterine systems (IUS) or Intrauterine Devices (IUD). An IUS/IUD must be inserted by a health professional. The copper IUD does not contain hormones. While a copper-containing IUD may be used as emergency contraception, the IUS has not been studied for this purpose.

Depo-Provera is an injection that provides three months of contraceptive protection. Noristerat is another injection; it is given every two months.

Contraceptive implants are inserted under the skin of the upper arm, and contain progesterone only. Jadelle (Norplant 2) consists of two rods that release a low dose of hormones. It is effective for five years. Nexplanon has replaced the former Implanon and is also a single rod that releases etonogestrel (similar to the body's natural progesterone). The only difference between Implanon and Nexplanon is that Nexplanon is radio-opaque and can be detected by X-ray. This is needed for cases of implant migration. It is effective for three years and is usually done in the office. It is over 99% effective. It works in 3 ways: 1. Prevents ovulation- usually, an egg does not mature 2. thickens cervical mucus to prevent sperm from reaching the egg 3. If those 2 fail, the last is that progesterone causes the lining of the uterus to be too thin for implantation.

=== Ormeloxifene ===
Ormeloxifene is a selective estrogen receptor modulator (SERM). Marketed as Centchroman, Centron, or Saheli, it is a pill that is taken once per week. Ormeloxifene is legally available only in India.

== Mechanism of action ==
The effect of hormonal agents on the reproductive system is complex. It is believed that combined hormonal contraceptives work primarily by preventing ovulation and thickening cervical mucus. Progestogen-only contraceptives can also prevent ovulation, but rely more significantly on the thickening of cervical mucus. Ormeloxifene does not affect ovulation, and its mechanism of action is not well understood.

=== Combined ===
Combined hormonal contraceptives were developed to prevent ovulation by suppressing the release of gonadotropins. They inhibit follicular development and prevent ovulation as a primary mechanism of action.

Progestogen negative feedback decreases the pulse frequency of gonadotropin-releasing hormone (GnRH) release by the hypothalamus, which decreases the release of follicle-stimulating hormone (FSH) and greatly decreases the release of luteinizing hormone (LH) by the anterior pituitary. Decreased FSH levels inhibit follicular development, preventing an increase in estradiol levels. Progestogen negative feedback and the lack of estrogen positive feedback on LH release prevent a mid-cycle LH surge. Inhibition of follicular development and the absence of a LH surge prevent ovulation.

Estrogen was originally included in oral contraceptives for better cycle control (to stabilize the endometrium and thereby reduce the incidence of breakthrough bleeding), but was also found to inhibit follicular development and help prevent ovulation. Estrogen negative feedback on the anterior pituitary greatly decreases the release of FSH, which inhibits follicular development and helps prevent ovulation.

Another primary mechanism of action of all progestogen-containing contraceptives is inhibition of sperm penetration through the cervix into the upper genital tract (uterus and fallopian tubes) by decreasing the amount of and increasing the viscosity of the cervical mucus.

The estrogen and progestogen in combined hormonal contraceptives have other effects on the reproductive system, but these have not been shown to contribute to their contraceptive efficacy:

- Slowing tubal motility and ova transport, which may interfere with fertilization.
- Endometrial atrophy and alteration of metalloproteinase content, which may impede sperm motility and viability, or theoretically inhibit implantation.
- Endometrial edema, which may affect implantation.

Insufficient evidence exists on whether changes in the endometrium could actually prevent implantation. The primary mechanisms of action are so effective that the possibility of fertilization during combined hormonal contraceptive use is very low. Since pregnancy occurs despite endometrial changes when the primary mechanisms of action fail, endometrial changes are unlikely to play a significant role, if any, in the observed effectiveness of combined hormonal contraceptives.

=== Progestogen-only ===
The mechanism of action of progestogen-only contraceptives depends on the progestogen activity and dose.

Low-dose progestogen-only contraceptives include traditional progestogen-only pills, the subdermal implant Jadelle, and the intrauterine system Mirena. These contraceptives inconsistently inhibit ovulation in ~50% of cycles and rely mainly on their progestogenic effect of thickening the cervical mucus and thereby reducing sperm viability and penetration.

Intermediate dose progestogen-only contraceptives, such as the progestogen-only pill Cerazette (or the subdermal implant Implanon), allow some follicular development but much more consistently inhibit ovulation in 97–99% of cycles. The same cervical mucus changes occur as with low-dose progestogens.

High-dose progestogen-only contraceptives, such as the injectables Depo-Provera and Noristerat, completely inhibit follicular development and ovulation. The same cervical mucus changes occur as with very low-dose and intermediate-dose progestogens.

In anovulatory cycles using progestogen-only contraceptives, the endometrium is thin and atrophic. If the endometrium was also thin and atrophic during an ovulatory cycle, this could theoretically interfere with implantation of a blastocyst (embryo).

=== Ormeloxifene ===
Ormeloxifene does not affect ovulation. It has been shown to increase the rate of blastocyst development and to increase the speed at which the blastocyst is moved from the fallopian tubes into the uterus. Ormeloxifene also suppresses proliferation and decidualization of the endometrium (the transformation of the endometrium in preparation for possible implantation of an embryo). While they are believed to prevent implantation rather than fertilization, exactly how these effects operate to prevent pregnancy is not understood

== Emergency contraception ==
The use of emergency contraceptives (ECs) allows for the prevention of a pregnancy after unprotected sex or contraception failure. In the United States, there are currently four different methods available, including ulipristal acetate (UPA), an oral progesterone receptor agonist-antagonist; levonorgestrel (LNG), an oral progestin; off-label use of combined oral contraceptives (Yuzpe regimen); and the copper intrauterine device (Cu-IUD).

=== Types ===
UPA, a progesterone agonist-antagonist, was approved by the FDA in 2010 for use as an EC. UPA acts as a partial agonist and antagonist of the progesterone receptor and works by preventing both ovulation and fertilization. Users of UPA are likely to experience delayed menses after the expected date. In the United States, UPA is sold under the brand name Ella, which is a 30 mg single pill to be taken up to 120 hours after unprotected sex. UPA has emerged as the most effective EC pill, however, the access to UPA is very limited in US cities. UPA is a prescription emergency contraceptive pill and a recent study has found that less than 10% of pharmacies indicated that a UPA prescription could be filled immediately. 72% of pharmacies reported the ability to order UPA and the prescription to be filled in a median wait time of 24 hours.

Plan B One-Step was the first levonorgestrel progestin-only EC approved by the FDA in 1999. Currently, there are many different brands of levonorgestrel EC pills, including Take Action, Next Choice One Dose, and My Way, and regimens include a single 1.5 mg pill of levonorgestrel. Levonorgestrel EC pills should be taken up to 72 hours after unprotected sex due to the drug becoming less effective over time. Levonorgestrel acts as an agonist of the progesterone receptor, preventing ovulation. Users of levonorgestrel often experience menses before the expected date. A prescription for levonorgestrel is not needed and can be found over the counter at local pharmacies. Because levonorgestrel does not have any life-threatening side effects, it has been approved by the FDA for use by all age groups.

The Yuzpe regimen used combination oral contraceptives for EC, has been used since 1974. This regimen is no longer commonly used due to side effects such as nausea and vomiting, as well as the discovery of more effective methods. The regimen consists of two pills, each containing a minimum of 100 μg of ethinyl estradiol and a minimum of 500 μg of levonorgestrel. The first pill is taken 72 hours after unprotected sex, and the second pill is taken 12 hours after the first. The Yuzpe regimen is often used in areas where dedicated EC methods are unavailable or where EC is not accepted.

The most effective form of EC is the insertion of a Cu-IUD within 5 days of unprotected sex. Because the Cu-IUD is inserted into the uterus, it has the advantage of providing continued contraception for up to 10 years. Cu-IUDs have been the only IUDs that have been approved as ECs due to the mechanism in hormonal and copper IUDs differing. Hormonal IUDs are used for the treatment of unplanned pregnancies by being placed in the uterus after an oral EC has been taken.

== Frequency of use ==
Pills—combined and progestogen-only—are the most common form of hormonal contraception. Worldwide, they account for 12% of contraceptive use. 21% of users of reversible contraceptives choose COCPs or POPs. Pills are especially popular in more developed countries, where they account for 25% of contraceptive use.

Injectable hormonal contraceptives are also used by a significant portion—about 6%—of the world's contraceptive users. Other hormonal contraceptives are less common, accounting for less than 1% of contraceptive use.

== History ==
Leo Loeb showed in 1911 that removing the corpora lutea hastened the next ovulation. In 1921, Ludwig Haberlandt demonstrated a temporary hormonal contraception in a female rabbit by transplanting ovaries from a second, pregnant, animal. (Makepeace et al, 1937) showed specifically that injecting progesterone inhibited ovulation in rabbits. By the 1930s, scientists had isolated and determined the structure of the steroid hormones and found that high doses of androgens, estrogens, or progesterone inhibited ovulation. Several economic, technological, and social obstacles had to be overcome before the development of the first hormonal contraceptive, the combined oral contraceptive pill (COCP). In 1957, the first COCP, Enovid, was approved in the United States for the treatment of menstrual disorders. In 1960, the U.S. Food and Drug Administration approved an application that allowed Enovid to be marketed as a contraceptive.

The first progestogen-only contraceptive was introduced in 1969: Depo-Provera, a high-dose progestin injection. Over the next decade and a half, other types of progestogen-only contraceptive were developed: a low-dose progestogen only pill (1973); Progestasert, the first hormonal intrauterine device (1976); and Norplant, the first contraceptive implant (1983).

Combined contraceptives have also been made available in a variety of forms. In the 1960s a few combined injectable contraceptives were introduced, notably Injectable Number 1 in China and Deladroxate in Latin America. A third combined injection, Cyclo-Provera, was reformulated in the 1980s by lowering the dose and renamed Cyclofem (also called Lunelle). Cyclofem and Mesigyna, another formulation developed in the 1980s, were approved by the World Health Organization in 1993. NuvaRing, a contraceptive vaginal ring, was first marketed in 2002. 2002 also saw the launch of Ortho Evra, the first contraceptive patch.

In 1991, ormeloxifene was introduced as a contraceptive in India. While it acts on the estrogen hormonal system, it is atypical in that it is a selective estrogen receptor modulator rather than an estrogen. It has the capacity for both estrogenic and antiestrogenic effects.

== See also ==
- Reproductive Health Supplies Coalition
- Male hormonal contraception
- Progestogen-only injectable contraceptive
- Estradiol-containing oral contraceptive
- List of progestogens available in the United States
- List of estrogens available in the United States
