= Progesterone vaginal ring =

Vaginal ring used for birth control when breastfeeding

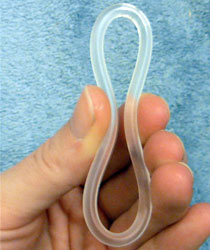
- NuvaRing, a similar birth control vaginal ring

Background
- Type: Hormonal
- First use: 1998
- Trade names: Progering, Fertiring, others

Failure rates (first year)
- Perfect use: ?
- Typical use: 1.5%

Usage
- Duration effect: 3 months
- User reminders: ?

Advantages and disadvantages
- STI protection: No
- Period advantages: Periods may not occur while ring is inserted
- Benefits: Easy insertion and removal

Progesterone vaginal ring, also known as progesterone-only vaginal ring, is a form of vaginal ring used for birth control when breastfeeding. Use can begin at four weeks and continue for at least up to a year following childbirth. Failure rates with usual use is about 1.5 per 100 women. It is used within the vagina with one ring lasting three months. The woman is able to place and remove the ring herself. It is sold under the brand names Progering among others.

Side effects include vaginal discharge and pain with urination. It does not appear to be associated with serious side effects. With use menstrual periods often do not resume. It was specifically made for use with breastfeeding as it does not affect milk production. It works by gradually releasing the hormone progesterone.

Progesterone vaginal rings have been approved for medical use since 1998. It is on the World Health Organization's List of Essential Medicines. As of 2014, they are available in a number of South and Central American countries. As of 2016, it is not available in the United States. It was developed by the Population Council.

== See also ==
- Pharmacokinetics of progesterone § Vaginal administration
