= C23H30O4 =

The molecular formula C_{23}H_{30}O_{4} (molar mass: 370.48 g/mol, exact mass: 370.2144 u) may refer to:

- Nomegestrol acetate (NOMAC)
- Segesterone acetate (SGA)
