= List of estrogens available in the United States =

This is a complete list of estrogens and formulations that are approved by the FDA and available in the United States. Estrogens are used as hormonal contraceptives, in hormone replacement therapy, and in the treatment of gynecological disorders.

== Estrogen-only ==
=== Oral/sublingual pills ===
- Conjugated estrogens (Premarin) – 0.3 mg, 0.45 mg, 0.625 mg, 0.9 mg, 1.25 mg, 2.5 mg
- Esterified estrogens (Amnestrogen, Estratab, Evex, Femogen, Menest) – 0.3 mg, 0.625 mg, 1.25 mg, 2.5 mg
- Estradiol (Estradiol, Gynodiol, Innofem) – 0.5 mg, 1 mg, 2 mg
- Estradiol acetate (Femtrace) – 0.45 mg, 0.9 mg, 1.8 mg
- Synthetic conjugated estrogens (Cenestin, Enjuvia) – 0.3 mg, 0.45 mg, 0.625 mg, 0.9 mg, 1.25 mg

Atypical (dual estrogen and nitrogen mustard alkylating antineoplastic):

- Estramustine phosphate sodium (Emcyt) – 140 mg

Oral estradiol valerate (except in combination with dienogest as an oral contraceptive) is not available in the U.S. and is used primarily in Europe.

=== Transdermal forms ===
==== Patches ====
- Estradiol (Alora, Climara, Esclim, Estraderm, Estradiol, Fempatch, Menostar, Minivelle, Vivelle, Vivelle-Dot) – 14 μg/24 hours, 25 μg/24 hours, 37.5 μg/24 hours, 50 μg/24 hours, 60 μg/24 hours, 75 μg/24 hours, 100 μg/24 hours

==== Gels ====
- Estradiol (Divigel, Elestrin, Estrogel) – 0.06% (0.87 g/activation, 1.25 g/activation), 0.1% (0.25 g/packet, 0.5 g/packet, 1 g/packet)

==== Sprays ====
- Estradiol (Evamist) – 1.53 mg/spray

==== Emulsions ====
- Estradiol hemihydrate (Estrasorb) – 0.25%

=== Vaginal forms ===
==== Tablets ====
- Estradiol (Estradiol, Vagifem) – 10 μg (25 μg discontinued)

==== Creams ====
- Conjugated estrogens (Premarin) – 0.625 mg/g (0.0625%)
- Estradiol (Estrace) – 0.01%
- Synthetic conjugated estrogens (Synthetic Conjugated Estrogens A) – 0.625 mg/g (0.0625%)

==== Inserts ====
- Estradiol (Imvexxy) – 4 μg, 10 μg

==== Rings ====
- Estradiol (Estring) – 7.5 μg/24 hours
- Estradiol acetate (Femring) – 50 μg/24 hours, 100 μg/24 hours

=== Intramuscular injection ===
- Conjugated estrogens (Premarin) – 25 mg/vial
- Estradiol cypionate (Depo-Estradiol, Estradiol Cypionate) – 5 mg/mL (1 mg/mL and 3 mg/mL discontinued)
- Estradiol valerate (Delestrogen, Estradiol Valerate) – 10 mg/mL, 20 mg/mL, 40 mg/mL

Polyestradiol phosphate (Estradurin) was previously available in the U.S. but was discontinued.

== Combined with progestins ==
=== For contraception ===
⇾ See here instead.

=== For menopausal symptoms ===
==== Oral pills ====
- Conjugated estrogens and medroxyprogesterone acetate (Premphase (Premarin, Cycrin 14/14), Premphase 14/14, Prempro, Prempro (Premarin, Cycrin), Prempro/Premphase) – 0.3 mg / 1.5 mg; 0.45 mg / 1.5 mg; 0.625 mg / 2.5 mg; 0.625 mg / 5 mg
- Estradiol and drospirenone (Angeliq) – 0.5 mg / 0.25 mg; 1 mg / 0.5 mg
- Estradiol and norethisterone acetate (Activella, Amabelz) – 1 mg / 0.5 mg; 0.5 mg / 0.1 mg
- Ethinylestradiol and norethisterone acetate (FemHRT) – 25 μg / 0.5 mg
- Estradiol and progesterone (Bijuva) – 0.5 mg / 100 mg; 1 mg / 100 mg

==== Transdermal patches ====
- Estradiol and levonorgestrel (Climara Pro) – 45 μg/24 hours / 15 μg/24 hours
- Estradiol and norethisterone acetate (Combipatch) – 50 μg/24 hours / 0.14 mg/24 hours; 50 μg/24 hours / 0.25 mg/24 hours

== Combined with other medications ==
=== Oral pills ===
- Conjugated estrogens and bazedoxifene acetate (Duavee) – 20 mg / 0.45 mg

== See also ==
- List of sex-hormonal medications available in the United States
- List of estrogens
- List of estrogen esters
- Oral contraceptive formulations
- Estradiol-containing oral contraceptive
