= List of steroids =

List of steroids may refer to:

- List of androgens/anabolic steroids – steroidal androgens/anabolic steroids
- List of androgens/anabolic steroids (alternate) – steroidal androgens/anabolic steroids
- List of steroidal antiandrogens – steroidal antiandrogens
- List of estrogens – estrogens
- List of progestogens – progestogens
- List of corticosteroids – corticosteroids, including both glucocorticoids and mineralocorticoids
- List of neurosteroids – excitatory, inhibitory, mixed, neurotrophic, antineurotrophic, and other neurosteroids, as well as pheromones and pherines
- List of steroidogenesis inhibitors – steroidogenesis inhibitors, or inhibitors of steroid biosynthesis and metabolism

As well as lists of steroid esters, including:

- List of androgen esters – androgen esters
- List of estrogen esters – estrogen esters
- List of progestogen esters – progestogen esters
- List of corticosteroid esters – corticosteroid esters

== See also ==
- List of steroid esters
- List of steroid medications available in the United States
