= List of steroid esters =

List of steroid esters may refer to:

- List of androgen esters – androgen esters
- List of estrogen esters – estrogen esters
- List of progestogen esters – progestogen esters
- List of corticosteroid esters – corticosteroid esters

== See also ==
- List of steroids
- List of sex-hormonal medications available in the United States
- List of combined sex-hormonal preparations
