= List of sex-hormonal medications available in the United States =

List of sex-hormonal medications available in the United States may refer to:

- List of androgens/anabolic steroids available in the United States
- List of estrogens available in the United States
- List of progestogens available in the United States

== See also ==
- List of combined sex-hormonal preparations
- List of steroids
- List of steroid esters
