= 18-Methylsegesterone acetate =

Chemical compound

Clinical data
- Other names: 18-Methyl-SGA; 13β-Ethyl-SGA; 18-Methylnestorone; 18-Methyl-NES; 13β-Ethylnestorone; 13β-Ethyl-NES; 18-Methylelcometrine; 16-Methylene-17α-acetoxy-18-methyl-19-norprogesterone; 16-Methylene-17α-hydroxy-18-methyl-19-norpregn-4-ene-3,20-dione acetate
- Drug class: Progestin; Progestogen; Progestogen ester

Identifiers
- IUPAC name: [(8R,9S,10R,13S,14S,17R)-17-Acetyl-13-ethyl-16-methylidene-3-oxo-2,6,7,8,9,10,11,12,14,15-decahydro-1H-cyclopenta[a]phenanthren-17-yl] acetate
- CAS Number: 192722-05-7
- PubChem CID: 9908093
- ChemSpider: 8083745
- CompTox Dashboard (EPA): DTXSID901336364

Chemical and physical data
- Formula: C_{24}H_{32}O_{4}
- Molar mass: 384.516 g·mol^{−1}
- 3D model (JSmol): Interactive image
- SMILES: CC[C@]12CC[C@H]3[C@H]([C@@H]1CC(=C)[C@@]2(C(=O)C)OC(=O)C)CCC4=CC(=O)CC[C@H]34
- InChI: InChI=1S/C24H32O4/c1-5-23-11-10-20-19-9-7-18(27)13-17(19)6-8-21(20)22(23)12-14(2)24(23,15(3)25)28-16(4)26/h13,19-22H,2,5-12H2,1,3-4H3/t19-,20+,21+,22-,23-,24-/m0/s1; Key:YIAUAVGJQYAQFE-ZUYVPRDGSA-N

18-Methylsegesterone acetate (18-methyl-SGA; also known as 18-methylnestorone) is a progestin medication of the 19-norprogesterone group which was never marketed. It was first described in a patent in 1997 and then in a literature paper in 2003. 18-Methyl-SGA is the C18 methyl or C13β ethyl derivative of segesterone acetate (SGA; 16-methylene-17α-acetoxy-19-norprogesterone), and shows 3 to 10 times the progestogenic potency of SGA in bioassays. This is analogous to the case of the 19-nortestosterone progestin norethisterone and its 18-methyl derivative levonorgestrel, the latter showing substantially increased potency relative to the former similarly. As SGA is already one of the most potent progestins to have been developed, with 100-fold the potency of progesterone and 10-fold the potency of levonorgestrel in bioassays, 18-methyl-SGA is an extremely potent progestogen, among if not the most potent known.

SGA is a highly selective progestogen. Like SGA, 18-methyl-SGA shows negligible affinity for the androgen receptor. While 18-methyl-SGA has not been assessed at the other steroid hormone receptors, it is expected to be highly selective for the progesterone receptor similarly to SGA. 18-Methyl-SGA shows over 16 times the affinity of progesterone for the progesterone receptor expressed in rat uterus. In terms of oral bioavailability, it is known that SGA is not active orally, while the oral activity of 18-methyl-SGA is unknown. The addition of an 18-methyl group to SGA is unlikely to affect its rate of delivery from sustained release systems. As such, 18-methyl-SGA should be ideally suited for use via routes of administration like subcutaneous implants and transdermal patches.

Comparison of potencies of selected progestogens in animals
Progestogen	PR RBA (rat uterus)	Clauberg assay^{a}	Pregnancy maintenance
18-Methyl-SGA	355%	0.3 μg	0.03 mg
Segesterone acetate	107%	1 μg	0.3 mg
Levonorgestrel	100%	3 μg	0.3 mg
Progesterone	22%	100 μg	1.0 mg
Footnotes: ^{a} = Minimum effective dose. Sources:

== See also ==
- List of progestogen esters § Esters of 19-norprogesterone derivatives
