= Segesterone acetate =

Progestin medication

Segesterone acetate INN: segesterone

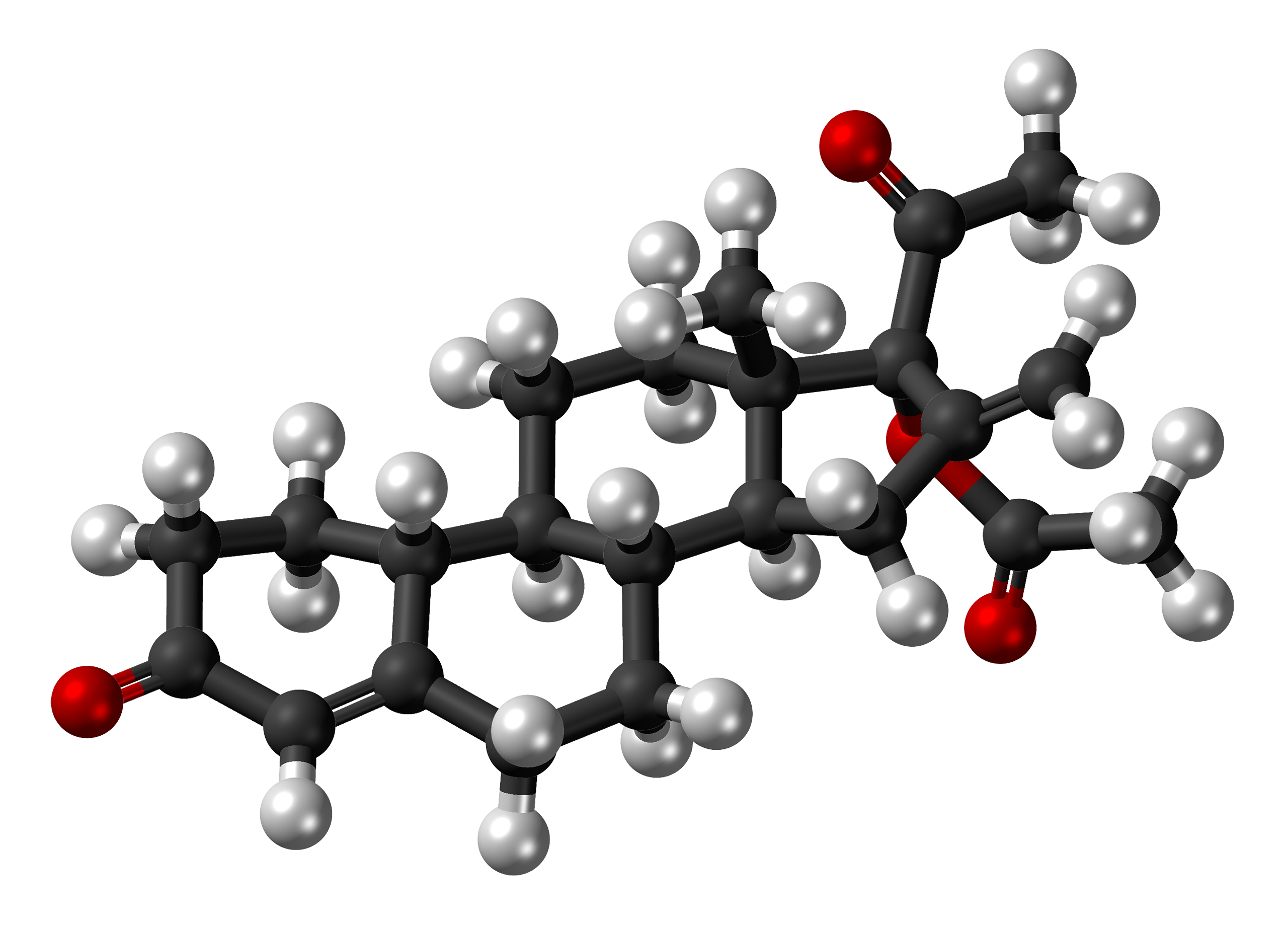

Clinical data
- Trade names: Nestorone, others
- Other names: SGA; SA; ST-1435; AC-6844; CS-0411; 16-Methylene-17α-acetoxy-19-norprogesterone; 16-Methylene-17α-acetoxy-19-norpregn-4-ene-3,20-dione
- Routes of administration: Subcutaneous implant, vaginal ring, transdermal patch
- Drug class: Progestogen; Progestin; Progestogen ester
- ATC code: None

Legal status
- Legal status: In general: ℞ (Prescription only)

Pharmacokinetic data
- Bioavailability: Oral: 10%
- Protein binding: 95% (to albumin and not to SHBG
- Metabolism: Hydroxylation (CYP3A4), reduction (5α-reductase)
- Elimination half-life: Vaginal ring: 4.5 hours Parenteral: 24–72 hours Oral: 1–2 hours

Identifiers
- CAS Number: 7759-35-5
- PubChem CID: 108059
- ChemSpider: 97161
- UNII: 9AMX4Q13CC
- KEGG: D10986
- ChEBI: CHEBI:135563
- ChEMBL: ChEMBL3707377
- CompTox Dashboard (EPA): DTXSID70998804

Chemical and physical data
- Formula: C_{23}H_{30}O_{4}
- Molar mass: 370.489 g·mol^{−1}
- 3D model (JSmol): Interactive image
- SMILES: O=C4\C=C2/[C@@H]([C@H]1CC[C@@]3([C@](OC(=O)C)(C(=C)\C[C@H]3[C@@H]1CC2)C(=O)C)C)CC4
- InChI: InChI=1S/C23H30O4/c1-13-11-21-20-7-5-16-12-17(26)6-8-18(16)19(20)9-10-22(21,4)23(13,14(2)24)27-15(3)25/h12,18-21H,1,5-11H2,2-4H3/t18-,19+,20+,21-,22-,23-/m0/s1; Key:CKFBRGLGTWAVLG-GOMYTPFNSA-N

Segesterone acetate (SGA), sold under the brand name Nestorone among others, is a progestin medication which is used in birth control and in the treatment of endometriosis. It is available both alone and in combination with an estrogen as segesterone acetate/ethinylestradiol. It is not effective by mouth and must be given by other routes, most typically as a vaginal ring or implant that is placed into fat.

Side effects of segesterone acetate are similar to those of other progestins. Segesterone acetate is a progestin, or a synthetic progestogen, and hence is an agonist of the progesterone receptor, the biological target of progestogens like progesterone. It has some affinity for the glucocorticoid receptor and has no other important hormonal activity.

Segesterone acetate was developed by the Population Council and was introduced for medical use by 2000. It is under development in the United States and Europe as a gel in combination with estradiol or testosterone for use as a method of birth control in women and in men, respectively. In August 2018, a first-of-its-kind one-year contraceptive vaginal ring containing segesterone acetate in combination with ethinyl estradiol was approved in the United States.

== Medical uses ==
Segesterone acetate is used as a hormonal contraceptive and in the treatment of endometriosis.

== Side effects ==
Side effects of segesterone acetate are similar to those of other progestins.

== Pharmacology ==
=== Pharmacodynamics ===
Segesterone acetate acts primarily as a high-affinity agonist of the progesterone receptor (272% of the affinity of progesterone and 136% of that of promegestone). It does not bind significantly to the androgen receptor, estrogen receptor, or mineralocorticoid receptor. As such, segesterone acetate does not have estrogenic, androgenic, antiandrogenic, or antimineralocorticoid activity. However, segesterone acetate does have significant affinity for the glucocorticoid receptor (38% of that of dexamethasone), but in spite of its relatively high affinity for the glucocorticoid receptor, it either does not have any glucocorticoid effects or shows glucocorticoid effects only at exceptionally high doses in animals. Segesterone acetate has no antiglucocorticoid activity in animals either. The ovulation-inhibiting dosage of parenteral segesterone acetate has been reported to be 150 μg per day, while the endometrial transformation dosage has been reported to be 600 μg per cycle. Segesterone acetate has antigonadotropic effects and functional antiestrogenic effects via its progestogenic activity similarly to other progestogens. In healthy young men, segesterone acetate alone at a dose of 2 to 3 mg/day as a transdermal gel (delivering 200–300 μg/day SGA) for 2 weeks suppressed testosterone levels from ~581 ng/dL to ~276 ng/dL (–52%).

=== Pharmacokinetics ===
Segesterone acetate is only weakly active orally, and is instead given as a subcutaneous implant. The oral bioavailability of segesterone acetate has been reported to be only 10%. However, it has also been reported that the medication is more than 100-fold as potent when delivered via subcutaneous implant relative to oral administration in rats. It has been estimated that segesterone acetate administered at a dose of 2 to 3 mg/day in the form of a transdermal gel delivers approximately 200 to 300 μg/day segesterone acetate based on a transdermal bioavailability of about 10 to 12%. Segesterone acetate is bound to albumin. It does not bind to sex hormone-binding globulin. Segesterone, the deacetylated form of segesterone acetate, is a metabolite of the medication. The biological half-life of parenteral segesterone acetate has been reported to be 24 to 72 hours. One study specifically reported a biological half-life of 26.8 hours. It has been reported that the biological half-life of segesterone acetate with oral administration is only 1 to 2 hours. In contrast to all of the preceding however, the US Food and Drug Administration (FDA) label for Annovera, a one-year vaginal ring containing ethinylestradiol and segesterone acetate, lists a circulating half-life of segesterone acetate of 4.5 hours.

== Chemistry ==
Segesterone acetate, also known as 16-methylene-17α-acetoxy-19-norprogesterone or as 16-methylene-17α-acetoxy-19-norpregn-4-ene-3,20-dione, is a synthetic norpregnane steroid and a derivative of progesterone. It is a combined derivative of 17α-hydroxyprogesterone and 19-norprogesterone, or a derivative of gestronol (17α-hydroxy-19-norprogesterone). The medication is the C17α acetate ester of segesterone, which, in contrast, was never marketed. Other 19-norprogesterone derivatives include demegestone, gestonorone caproate (norhydroxyprogesterone caproate), nomegestrol acetate, promegestone, and trimegestone. Segesterone acetate is a derivative of 16-methylene-17α-hydroxyprogesterone acetate, and is the analogue of methenmadinone acetate without the C19 methyl group or the C6 double bond. A derivative of segesterone acetate with even greater progestogenic potency in comparison to segesterone acetate is 18-methylsegesterone acetate.

=== Synthesis ===
The chemical synthesis of segesterone acetate is described:

In a two-step, one-pot procedure, the enone of bolandione (1) was converted to its enol ether using triethylorthoformate, followed by formylation of the remaining ketone to provide PC86346380 (2). The ethynylation reaction with trimethysilylacetylene [1066-54-2] in deprotonated using LiHMDS base followed by removal of the TMS group generated PC71617290 (3). The alkyne was then hydrated under acidic conditions to the corresponding ketone, PC89665355 (4). The next series of reactions facilitated inversion of configuration about the congested C-17 locus. The treatment with phenyl sulfuryl chloride resulted in chloride displacement and a 2,3-sigmatropic rearrangement to arrive at sulfoxide, PC89665367 (5). Subjection of the enone to trimethoxyphosphine and triethylamine, followed by treatment with hypochlorous acetic anhydride conditions induced a Mislow–Evans rearrangement to complete the preparation of segesterone acetate (6).

== History ==
Segesterone acetate was developed by the Population Council. It has been marketed since at least 2000.

== Society and culture ==
=== Generic names ===
Segesterone acetate is the generic name of the drug and its USAN. It is also known by its brand names Nestorone and Elcometrine, as well as by its former developmental code names ST-1435, AC-6844, and CS-0411.

=== Brand names ===
Segesterone acetate is marketed alone under the brand names Nestorone and Elcometrine and in combination with ethinylestradiol as segesterone acetate/ethinylestradiol under the brand name Annovera among others.

=== Availability ===
Segesterone acetate is available alone in several South American countries, including Brazil. It is available in the United States and Canada as a contraceptive vaginal ring in combination with ethinylestradiol.

== Research ==
A combination of segesterone acetate and the estrogen estradiol is under development in a transdermal gel formulation for use as a contraceptive in women by the Population Council in conjunction with Antares Pharma in the United States and Europe. As of December 2017, it is in phase III clinical trials for this indication. The medication has the tentative brand name NestraGel. A combination of segesterone acetate and the estrogen ethinylestradiol in a vaginal ring formulation for use as a one-year contraceptive was developed by the Population Council in multiple regions including Latin America, Europe, and Australia. It completed phase III clinical trials and was approved in the United States in August 2018.

A combination of segesterone acetate and the androgen testosterone is under development as a transdermal gel formulation for use as a hormonal contraceptive in men by the Population Council. As of December 2017, it is in phase II clinical studies for this purpose. In a trial, 100 couples used segesterone/testosterone dermal gel as the sole contraception method, which resulted in no pregnancy. Side effects were described as mild, comprising acne, weight gain and nocturnal sweating.
