= 6-Ketoprogesterone =

Names
- IUPAC name Pregn-4-ene-3,6,20-trione
- Other names 6-Ketoprogesterone;6-Oxoprogesterone

Identifiers
CAS Number	2243-08-5
3D model (JSmol)	Interactive image
ChemSpider	222301
MeSH	C111515
PubChem CID	104796
UNII	2698PNJ55U
CompTox Dashboard (EPA)	DTXSID90945113
- InChI: InChI=1S/C21H28O3/c1-12(22)15-4-5-16-14-11-19(24)18-10-13(23)6-8-21(18,3)17(14)7-9-20(15,16)2/h10,14-17H,4-9,11H2,1-3H3/t14-,15+,16-,17-,20+,21+/m0/s1 Key: LASCNIPXMJNRGS-HGUQNLGYSA-N; InChI=1/C21H28O3/c1-12(22)15-4-5-16-14-11-19(24)18-10-13(23)6-8-21(18,3)17(14)7-9-20(15,16)2/h10,14-17H,4-9,11H2,1-3H3/t14-,15+,16-,17-,20+,21+/m0/s1 Key: LASCNIPXMJNRGS-HGUQNLGYBS
- SMILES: O=C4\C=C3\C(=O)C[C@@H]1[C@H](CC[C@@]2([C@@H](C(=O)C)CC[C@@H]12)C)[C@@]3(C)CC4

Properties
Chemical formula	C_{21}H_{28}O_{3}
Molar mass	328.452 g·mol^{−1}
Density	1.14 g/cm^{3}
- Except where otherwise noted, data are given for materials in their standard state (at 25 °C [77 °F], 100 kPa). Infobox references

6-Ketoprogesterone is an orally active oxidized form of progesterone that contains a keto group at position-6.
