= Gottlieb Haberlandt =

Austrian botanist (1854–1945)

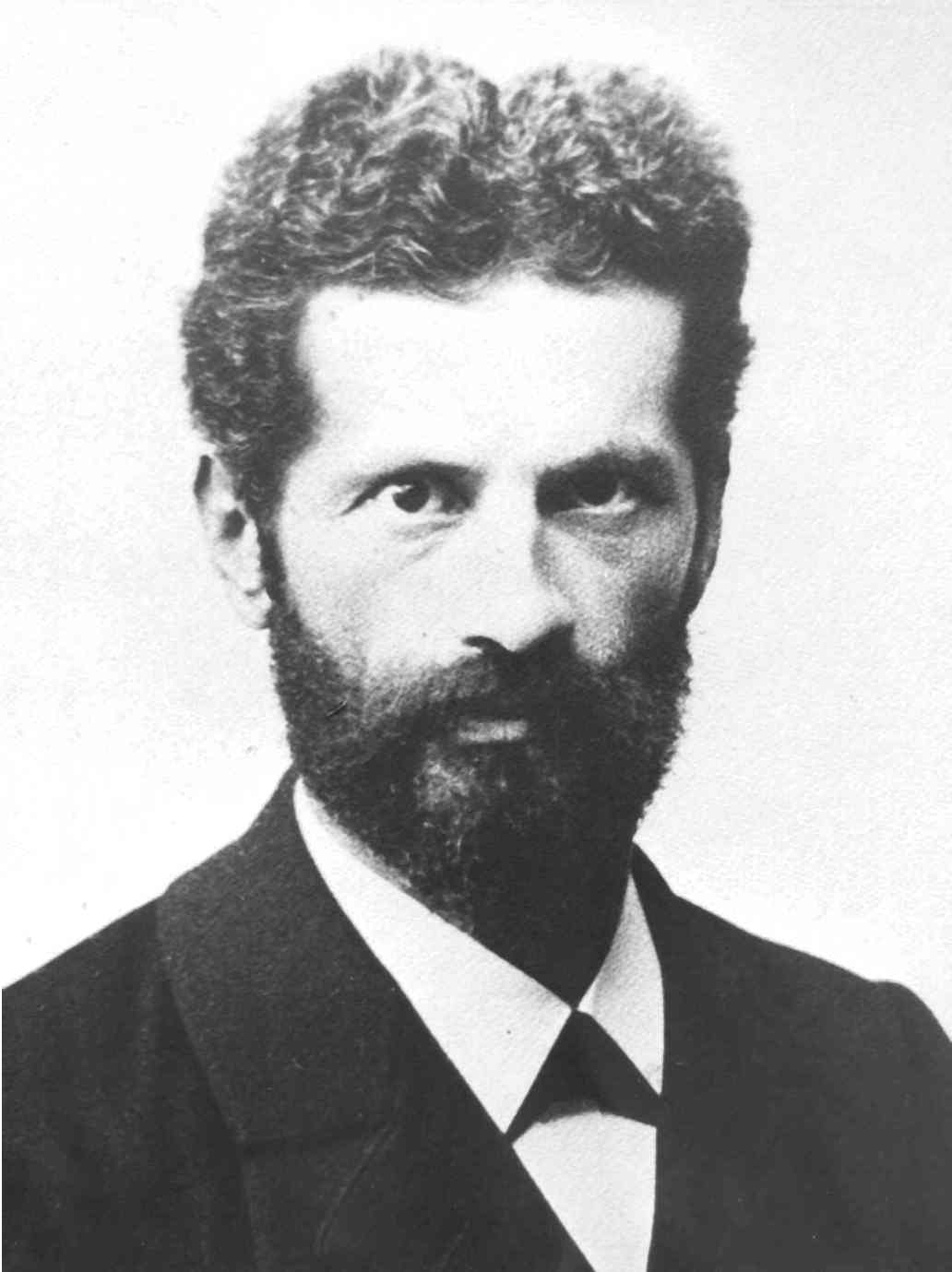
- Born: 28 November 1854; Mosonmagyaróvár
- Died: 30 January 1945 (aged 90); Berlin
- Scientific career
- Fields: Botany

Gottlieb Haberlandt (28 November 1854 – 30 January 1945) was an Austrian botanist. He was the son of European 'soybean' pioneer Professor Friedrich J. Haberlandt. His son Ludwig Haberlandt was an early reproductive physiologist now given credit as the 'grandfather' of the birth control pill.

Haberlandt first pointed out the possibilities of the culture of isolated tissues, plant tissue culture. He suggested that the potentialities of individual cells via tissue culture and also suggested that the reciprocal influences of tissues on one another could be determined by this method. Since Haberlandt's original assertions methods for tissue and cell culture have been realized, it has led to significant discoveries in Biology and Medicine. His original idea presented in 1902 was called totipotentiality (now termed as totipotency): “Theoretically all plant cells are able to give rise to a complete plant.” In his 1905 work "Die lichtsinnesorgane der laubblätter" Haberlandt suggested that plants might be able to see using organs on the upper surface of the leaf.

The more efficient C-4 photosynthesis in land plants depends on a specialized Kranz (German for wreath) leaf anatomy first described by Gottlieb Haberlandt in 1904.
