= Ludwig Haberlandt =

Austrian scientist (1885–1932)

- Born: 1 February 1885; Graz
- Died: 22 July 1932 (aged 47)
- Known for: Hormonal contraception

Ludwig Haberlandt (1 February 1885 – 22 July 1932) was an Austrian scientist, who is known as a father of hormonal contraception. In 1921 he carried out experiments on rabbits and he demonstrated a temporary hormonal contraception in a female by transplanting ovaries from a second, pregnant, animal.

His father was the eminent botanist, Gottlieb Haberlandt, plant tissue culture theorist and visionary; his grandfather was the European 'soybean' pioneer and trailblazer Friedrich J. Haberlandt.

Supported by the Rockefeller Foundation he began clinical trials in 1930 after successful production of a hormonal preparation, Infecundin®, by the G. Richter Company in Budapest, Hungary. He ended his 1931 book, Die hormonale Sterilisierung des weiblichen Organismus, with a visionary claim: 'Unquestionably, practical application of the temporary hormonal sterilization in women would markedly contribute to the ideal in human society already enunciated a generation earlier by Sigmund Freud (1898). Theoretically, one of the greatest triumphs of mankind would be the elevation of procreation into a voluntary and deliberate act.' He was hounded for his views on reproductive biology up to his death from either suicide, or heart attack.
