= Etonogestrel =

Chemical compound

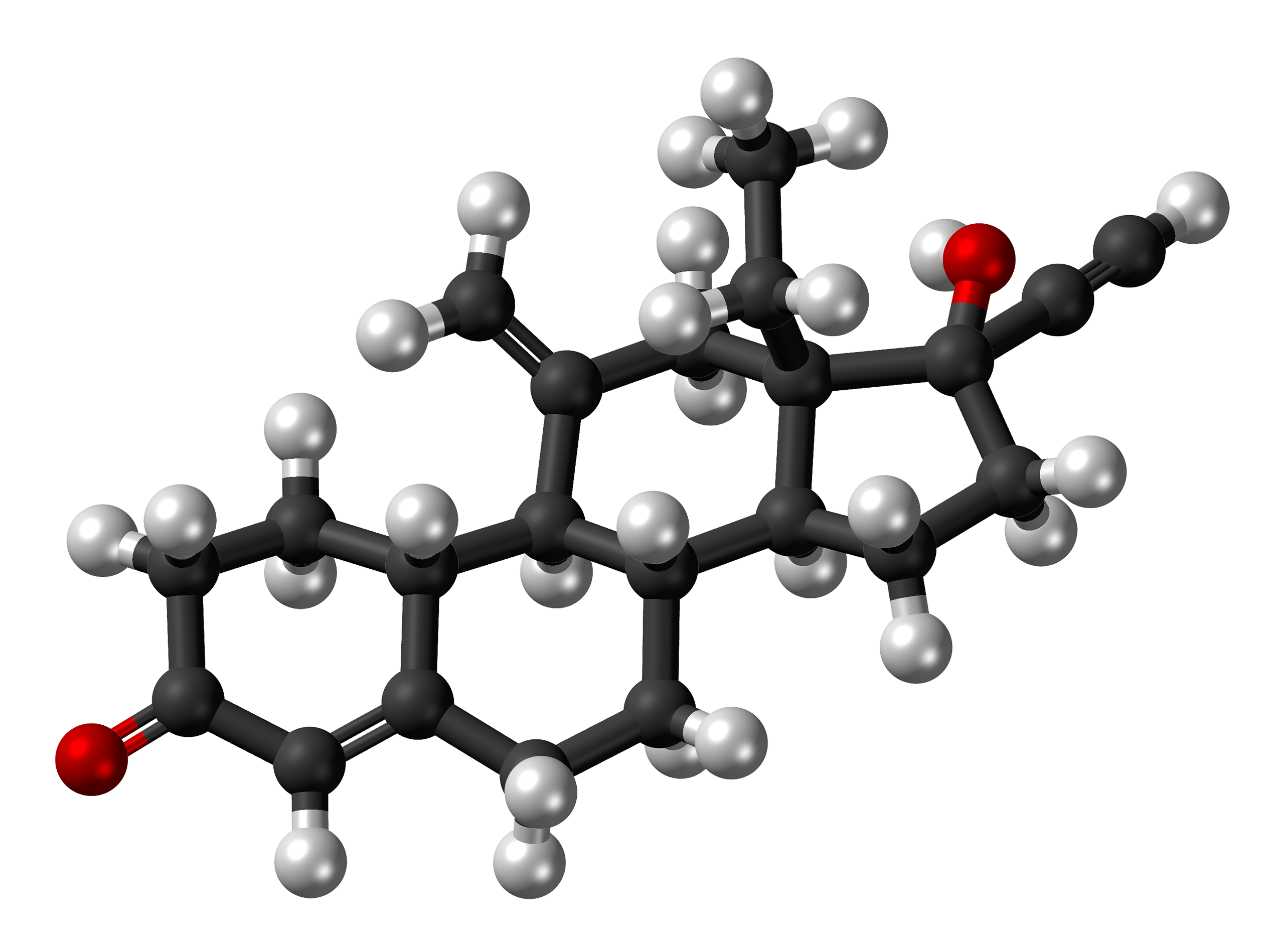

Clinical data
- Trade names: Circlet, Implanon, Nexplanon, others
- Other names: ORG-3236; SCH-900702 (with EE); 3-Ketodesogestrel; 3-Oxodesogestrel; 11-Methylenelevonorgestrel; 11-Methylene-17α-ethynyl-18-methyl-19-nortestosterone; 11-Methylene-17α-ethynyl-18-methylestr-4-en-17β-ol-3-one
- AHFS/Drugs.com: Professional Drug Facts
- MedlinePlus: a604032
- Pregnancy category: AU: B3
- Routes of administration: Subcutaneous implant, vaginal ring
- Drug class: Progestogen; Progestin
- ATC code: G03AC08 (WHO)

Legal status
- Legal status: AU: S4 (Prescription only); CA: ℞-only; UK: POM (Prescription only); US: ℞-only; EU: Rx-only; In general: ℞ (Prescription only)

Pharmacokinetic data
- Bioavailability: Implant: 100% Vaginal ring: 100%
- Protein binding: ≥98% (66% to albumin, 32% to SHBG)
- Metabolism: Liver (CYP3A4)
- Elimination half-life: 21–38 hours
- Excretion: Urine (major), feces (minor)

Identifiers
- IUPAC name: (8S,9S,10R,13S,14S,17R)-13-Ethyl-17-ethynyl-17-hydroxy-11-methylidene-2,6,7,8,9,10,12,14,15,16-decahydro-1H-cyclopenta[a]phenanthren-3-one
- CAS Number: 54048-10-1
- PubChem CID: 21729469
- IUPHAR/BPS: 7590
- DrugBank: DB00294
- ChemSpider: 5292944
- UNII: 304GTH6RNH
- KEGG: D04104
- ChEBI: CHEBI:50777
- ChEMBL: ChEMBL1531
- CompTox Dashboard (EPA): DTXSID9046782
- ECHA InfoCard: 100.053.561

Chemical and physical data
- Formula: C_{22}H_{28}O_{2}
- Molar mass: 324.464 g·mol^{−1}
- 3D model (JSmol): Interactive image
- SMILES: CC[C@]12CC(=C)[C@H]3[C@H]([C@@H]1CC[C@]2(C#C)O)CCC4=CC(=O)CC[C@H]34
- InChI: InChI=1S/C22H28O2/c1-4-21-13-14(3)20-17-9-7-16(23)12-15(17)6-8-18(20)19(21)10-11-22(21,24)5-2/h2,12,17-20,24H,3-4,6-11,13H2,1H3/t17-,18-,19-,20+,21-,22-/m0/s1; Key:GCKFUYQCUCGESZ-BPIQYHPVSA-N

Etonogestrel birth control implant
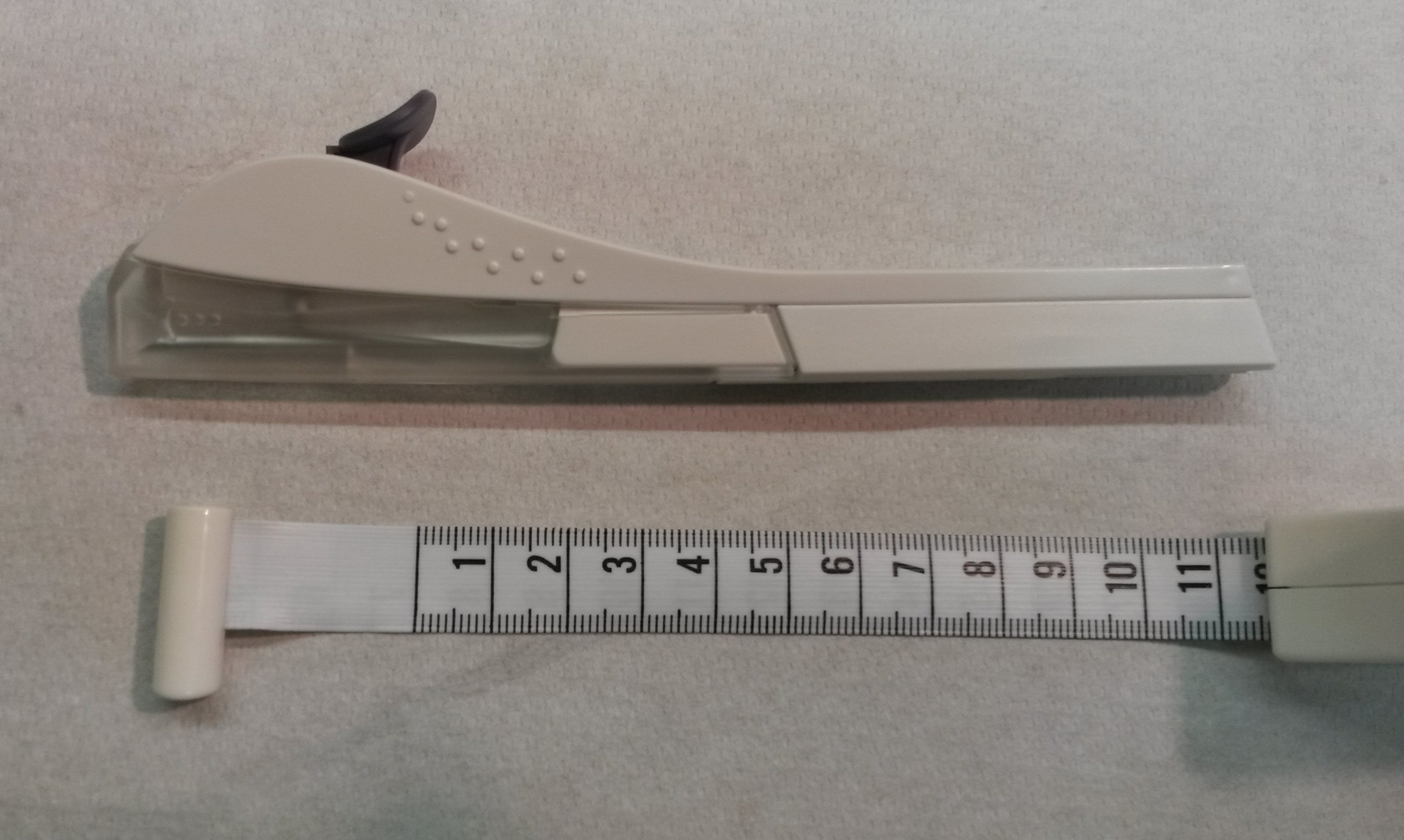
- Implanon

Background
- Type: Hormonal; Progestin-only implant
- First use: 1998 Indonesia
- Synonyms: Etonogestrel contraceptive implant
- Trade names: Implanon, Nexplanon, others
- AHFS/Drugs.com: FDA Professional Drug Information

Failure rates (first year)
- Perfect use: 0.05%
- Typical use: 0.05%

Usage
- Duration effect: 3 to 5 years
- Reversibility: Yes
- User reminders: Requires removal after the 3–5 years

Advantages and disadvantages
- STI protection: No
- Weight: May cause weight gain
- Period disadvantages: May cause irregular or prolonged bleeding
- Period advantages: Minimizes pain. In 33% no periods.
- Benefits: Long-term contraception.

Etonogestrel is a medication which is used as a means of birth control. It is available as an implant placed under the skin of the upper arm under the brand names Nexplanon and Implanon and as a vaginal ring under the brand names NuvaRing and Circlet. It is a progestin that is also used in combination with ethinylestradiol, an estrogen. Etonogestrel is effective as a means of birth control and lasts at least three or four years with some data showing effectiveness for five years. Following removal, fertility quickly returns.

Side effects of etonogestrel include menstrual irregularities, breast tenderness, mood changes, acne, headaches, vaginitis, and others. Etonogestrel is a progestin, or a synthetic progestogen, and hence is an agonist of the progesterone receptor, the biological target of progestogens like progesterone. It works by stopping ovulation, thickening the mucus around the opening of the cervix, and altering the lining of the uterus. It has very weak androgenic and glucocorticoid activity and no other important hormonal activity.

Etonogestrel was patented in 1972 and introduced for medical use in 1998. It became available in the United States in 2006. Etonogestrel implants are approved in more than 90 countries and used by about three million women globally as of 2010.

A closely related and more widely known and used progestin, desogestrel, is a prodrug of etonogestrel in the body.

== Medical uses ==
Etonogestrel is used in hormonal contraception in form of the etonogestrel contraceptive implant and the contraceptive vaginal ring (brand names NuvaRing, Circlet), the latter in combination with ethinylestradiol.

Etonogestrel birth control implants are a type of long-acting reversible contraception, which has been shown to be one of the most effective form of birth control. The failure rate of the implants is 0.05% for both perfect use and typical use because the method requires no user action after placement. Studies of one type, which include over 2,467 women-years of exposure, found no pregnancies.

Other studies have found some failures with this method, some attributed to failures of the method itself and others to improper placement, drug interactions, or conception prior to method insertion.

In comparison, tubal sterilization has a failure rate of 0.5% and IUDs have a failure rate of 0.2–0.8%. A single implant is approved for five years of use for pregnancy prevention.

Etonogestrel implants should not be used on patients who already are or already may be pregnant, have unexplained vaginal bleeding, or have severe liver disease.

== Side effects ==
Irregular bleeding and spotting: Many women will experience some type of irregular, unpredictable, prolonged, frequent, or infrequent bleeding. Some women also experience amenorrhea. For some women, prolonged bleeding will decline after the first three months of use. However, other women may experience this bleeding pattern through all five years of use. While these patterns are not dangerous, they are the most common reason that women give for discontinuing the use of the implant. After removal, bleeding patterns return to previous patterns in most women.

Insertion complications: Some minor side effects such as bruising, skin irritation, or pain around the insertion site are common. However, there are some rare complications that can occur, such as infection or expulsion. In some cases, a serious complication occurs when the provider fails to insert, and the rod is left in the inserter. An Australian study reported 84 pregnancies as a result of such failure.

Migration: Although very rare, the rod can sometimes move slightly within the arm. This can make removal more difficult. It is possible that insertion in the same site as a previous implant increases the likelihood of migration. Rods can be located only through high-frequency ultrasound or magnetic resonance imaging (MRI). It can be located using traditional X-ray or CT-scan because of the inclusion of barium sulphate. There have been rare reports of implants having reached the lung via the pulmonary artery. Correct subdermal insertion over the triceps muscle reduces the risk of these events.

Possible weight gain: Some women may experience slight weight gain when using the implant. However, current studies are not conclusive because they do not compare the weight of women using implants with a control group of women not using the implant. The average increase in body weight in studies was less than 5 pounds (2.25 kg) over 2 years.

Ovarian cysts: A small portion of women using implants and other contraceptive implants develop ovarian cysts. Usually these cysts will disappear without treatment.

Pregnancy: It is recommended that implants be removed if a pregnancy does occur. However, there is no evidence to suggest that the implant has a negative effect on pregnancy or a developing fetus.

Acne: Acne has been self-reported to be a side effect, and is listed as a side effect by the FDA. However, a study of users found that a majority of users with acne before their insertion reported that their acne had decreased, and only 16% of those who did not have acne before insertion developed acne.

Other possible symptoms: Other symptoms that have been reported in trials of implants include headache, emotional lability, depression, abdominal pain, loss of libido, and vaginal dryness. However, there have been no studies that conclusively determine that these symptoms are caused by the implant.

== Overdose ==
No serious side effects are expected when overdosing contraceptives in general.

== Interactions ==
Efavirenz, an inducer of the liver enzyme CYP3A4, appears to decrease etonogestrel levels and increase rates of undesired pregnancy among implant users.

Similar effects are expected for other CYP3A4 inducers, but it is not known whether these are clinically relevant. The opposite is true of CYP3A4 inhibitors such as ketoconazole, itraconazole and clarithromycin: they might increase etonogestrel concentrations in the body.

== Device description ==
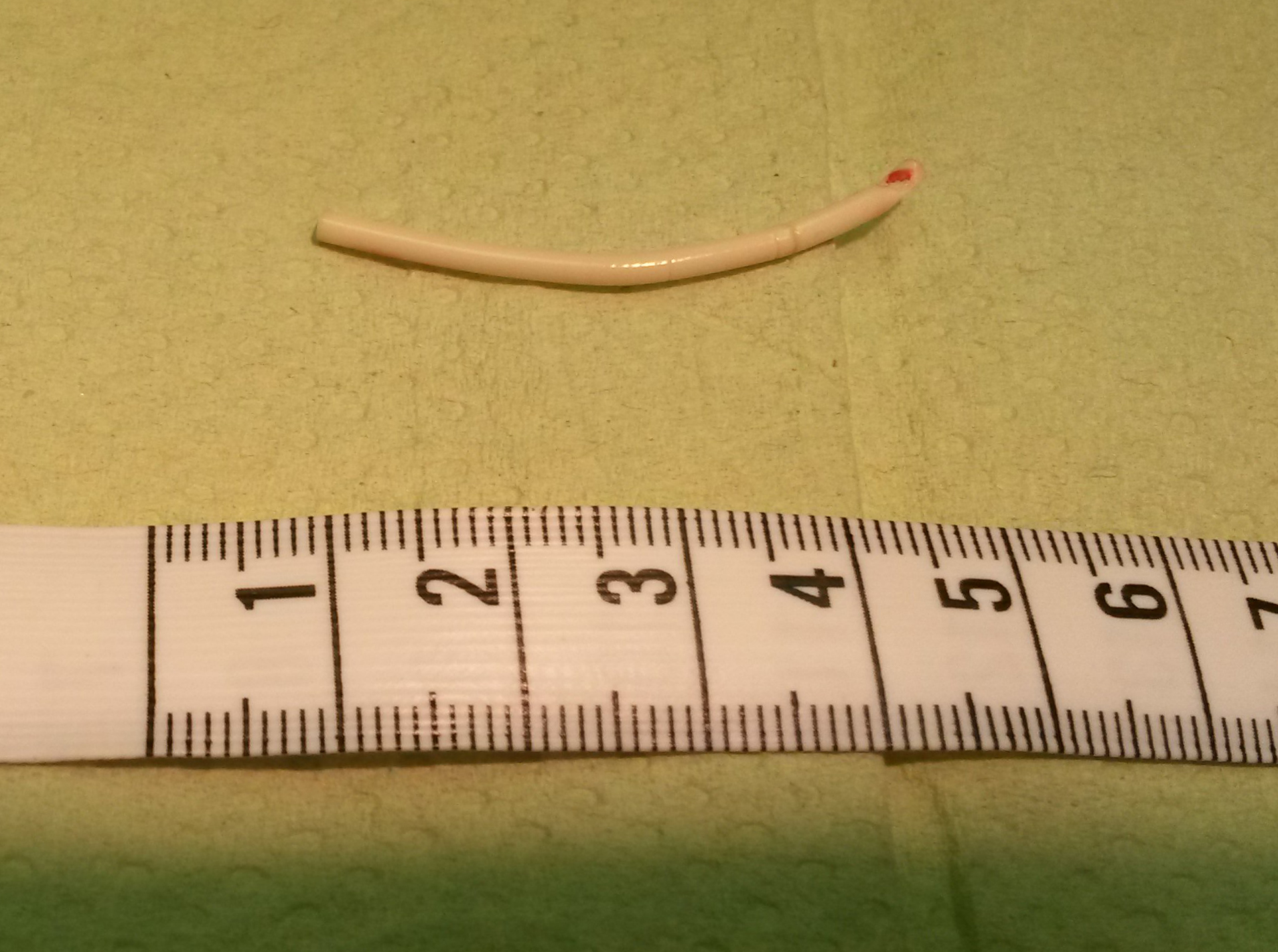
A removed rod

Nexplanon/Implanon consists of a single rod made of ethylene vinylacetate copolymer that is 4 cm long and 2 mm in diameter. It is similar to a matchstick in size. The rod contains 68 mg of etonogestrel (sometimes called 3-keto-destrogestrel), a type of progestin. Peak serum etonogestrel concentrations have been found to reach 781–894 pg/mL in the first few weeks, gradually decreasing to 192–261 pg/mL after one year, 154–194 pg/mL after two years, and 156–177 pg/mL after three years, maintaining ovulation suppression and contraceptive efficacy. Serum levels maintain relatively stable through 36 months.

Nexplanon/Implanon was originally FDA-approved for 3 years of use; based on extended-use efficacy data it is now FDA-approved for five years of use.

It is a type of progestogen-only contraception.

=== Insertion and removal ===
Implantation of Implanon

An experienced clinician must perform the insertion of implants to ensure proper insertion and minimize the risk of nerve damage or misplacement, which could result in pregnancy. Before insertion, the arm is washed with a cleaning solution and a local anesthetic is applied to the upper arm around the insertion area. A needle-like applicator is used to insert the rod under the skin into the subdermal tissue on the inner side of the arm posterior to the groove between the biceps and triceps muscles. The average time for insertion is 0.5 to 1 minute. A bandage should be kept on the insertion site for 24 hours afterwards. Bruising and mild discomfort are common after insertion. Serious insertion site complications such as infection can occur very rarely, in less than 1% of patients. If a woman receives an implant outside the first five days of her period, she should wait to have sex or use a backup method of contraception (such as a condom, female condom, diaphragm, sponge, or emergency contraception) for the following week after insertion to prevent pregnancy. However, if the implant is inserted during the first five days of a woman's period, the drug typically is effective for that cycle and beyond.

Removal of Implanon

Implants can be removed at any time if pregnancy is desired. The rod must also be removed by an experienced clinician. At removal, a local anesthetic is again used around the implant area at the distal end. If the provider cannot feel the implant, imaging tests may be necessary to locate the rod before it can be removed. A small incision is made in the skin over the end of the implant site. In some cases, a fibrous sheath may have formed around the implant, in which case the sheath must be incised. The implant is removed using forceps. The removal procedure lasts, on average, 3 to 3.5 minutes.

=== Fertility after removal ===
Within a week of removal, the hormones from the device leave the body and etonogestrel is undetectable in most users. Most women will begin to ovulate within six weeks of removal. Fertility levels will return to what they were before implant insertion.

=== Differences ===
Nexplanon and Implanon NXT are essentially identical to Implanon, except Nexplanon and Implanon NXT have 15 mg of barium sulphate added to the core, so it is detectable by x-ray. Nexplanon and Implanon NXT also has a pre-loaded applicator for easier insertion.

== Pharmacology ==
The mechanism of action of progestin-only contraceptives depends on the progestin activity and dose. Intermediate dose progestin-only contraceptives like Nexplanon or Implanon allow some follicular development but inhibit ovulation in almost all cycles as the primary mechanism of action. Ovulation was not observed in studies of Implanon in the first two years of use and only rarely in the third year with no pregnancies. A secondary mechanism of action is the progestogenic increase in cervical mucus viscosity which inhibits sperm penetration. Hormonal contraceptives also have effects on the endometrium that theoretically could affect implantation, however no scientific evidence indicates that prevention of implantation actually results from their use.

=== Pharmacodynamics ===
Etonogestrel is a progestogen, or an agonist of the progesterone receptor. It is less androgenic than levonorgestrel and norethisterone, and it does not cause a decrease in sex hormone-binding globulin levels. However, it is still associated with acne in up to 13.5% of patients when used as an implant, though this side effect only accounts for 1.3% of premature removals of the implant. In addition to its progestogenic and weak androgenic activity, etonogestrel binds to the glucocorticoid receptor with about 14% of the affinity of dexamethasone (relative to 1% for levonorgestrel) and has very weak glucocorticoid activity. Etonogestrel has no other hormonal activity (e.g., estrogenic, antimineralocorticoid). Some inhibition of 5α-reductase and hepatic cytochrome P450 enzymes has been observed with etonogestrel in vitro, similarly to other 19-nortestosterone progestins.

Relative affinities (%) of etonogestrel and metabolites
Compound	PR	AR	ER	GR	MR	SHBG	CBG
Etonogestrel	150	20	0	14	0	15	0
5α-Dihydroetonogestrel	9	17	0	?	?	?	?
Sources: Values are percentages (%). Reference ligands (100%) were prome-gestone for the PR, metribolone for the AR, E2 for the ER, DEXA for the GR, aldosterone for the MR, DHT for SHBG, and cortisol for CBG. Sources:

Glucocorticoid activity of selected steroids in vitro
Steroid	Class	TR (↑)^{a}	GR (%)^{b}
Dexamethasone	Corticosteroid	++	100
Ethinylestradiol	Estrogen	–	0
Etonogestrel	Progestin	+	14
Gestodene	Progestin	+	27
Levonorgestrel	Progestin	–	1
Medroxyprogesterone acetate	Progestin	+	29
Norethisterone	Progestin	–	0
Norgestimate	Progestin	–	1
Progesterone	Progestogen	+	10
Footnotes: ^{a} = Thrombin receptor (TR) upregulation (↑) in vascular smooth muscle cells (VSMCs). ^{b} = RBA (%) for the glucocorticoid receptor (GR). Strength: – = No effect. + = Pronounced effect. ++ = Strong effect. Sources:

=== Pharmacokinetics ===
The bioavailability of etonogestrel when given as a subcutaneous implant or as a vaginal ring is 100%. Steady-state levels of etonogestrel are achieved within one week upon insertion as an implant or vaginal ring. The mean volume of distribution of etonogestrel is 201 L. The plasma protein binding of the medication is at least 98%, with 66% bound to albumin and 32% bound to sex hormone-binding globulin. Etonogestrel is metabolized in the liver by CYP3A4. The biological activity of its metabolites is unknown. The elimination half-life of etonogestrel is about 25 to 29 hours. Following removal of an etonogestrel-containing implant, levels of the medication were below the limits of assay detection by one week. The major portion of etonogestrel is eliminated in urine and a minor portion is eliminated in feces.

== Chemistry ==
Etonogestrel, also known as 11-methylene-17α-ethynyl-18-methyl-19-nortestosterone or as 11-methylene-17α-ethynyl-18-methylestr-4-en-17β-ol-3-one, is a synthetic estrane steroid and a derivative of testosterone. It is more specifically a derivative of norethisterone (17α-ethynyl-19-nortestosterone) and is a member of the gonane (18-methylestrane) subgroup of the 19-nortestosterone family of progestins. Etonogestrel is the C3 ketone derivative of desogestrel and the C11 methylene derivative of levonorgestrel and is also known as 3-ketodesogestrel and as 11-methylenelevonorgestrel.

=== Synthesis ===
The chemical synthesis of etonogestrel has been reported: Others: The starting material is an intermediate in Norgestrel & Norboletone synthesis (q.v.).

21st century methods:

== History ==
The possibility of the subdermal contraceptive implant began when silicone was discovered in the 1940s and found to be bio-compatible with the human body. In 1964, Folkman and Long published the first study demonstrating that such a rod could be used to deliver drugs. In 1966 Dziuk and Cook published a study that looked at release rates and suggested that the rods could be well suited for contraception. After a study that used implants with progestogens for contraception, the Population Council developed and patented Norplant and Jadelle. Norplant has six rods and is considered a first-generation implant. Jadelle (Norplant II), a two-rod implant, and other single rod implants that followed, were developed because of complications resulting from Norplant's six-rod system. The Jadelle system contains two silicone rods mixed with levonorgestrel. In 1990 De Nijs patented a co-axial extrusion technique of ethylene vinylacetate copolymers and 3-keto-desogestrel (etonogestrel) for the preparation of long-acting contraceptive devices, such as Implanon, Nexplanon and Nuvaring. The single rods were less visible under the skin and used etonogestrel as opposed to levonorgestrel in the hopes that it would reduce side effects.

Desogestrel (3-deketoetonogestrel), a prodrug of etonogestrel, was introduced for medical use in 1981.

Norplant was used internationally beginning in 1983 and was marketed in the United States and the United Kingdom in 1993. There were many complications associated with Norplant removal in the United States and it was taken off the market in 2002. Although Jadelle was approved by the FDA, it has never been marketed in the United States, but it is widely used in Africa and Asia.

Etonogestrel itself was first introduced as Implanon in Indonesia in 1998, was marketed in the United Kingdom shortly thereafter, and approved for use in the United States in 2006. Nexplanon was developed to eliminate the problem of non-insertion and localization of Implanon by changing the inserter device and making the rod radiopaque. As of January 2012, Implanon is no longer being marketed and Nexplanon is the only available single-rod implant.

== Society and culture ==
=== Generic names ===
Etonogestrel is the generic name of the drug and its INN, USAN, and BAN. It is also known by its developmental code name ORG-3236.

=== Brand names ===
Etonogestrel is marketed under the brand names Circlet, Implanon, Nexplanon, and NuvaRing.

=== Availability ===
Etonogestrel is available widely throughout the world, including in the United States, Canada, the United Kingdom, Ireland, elsewhere throughout Europe, South Africa, Latin America, South, East, and Southeast Asia, and elsewhere in the world.

== Research ==
An etonogestrel-releasing intrauterine device was under development for use as a form of birth control for women but development was discontinued in 2015.

Etonogestrel has been studied for use as a potential male contraceptive.

== See also ==
- Ethinylestradiol/etonogestrel
- Desogestrel
