= Extended cycle combined hormonal contraceptive =

Type of contraceptive

Extended cycle combined hormonal contraceptives

Background
- Type: Hormonal
- First use: 1993 (first randomized study)

Pregnancy rates (first year)
- Perfect use: ?
- Typical use: 0.9%

Usage
- Duration effect: varies
- Reversibility: Yes
- User reminders: varies

Advantages and disadvantages
- STI protection: No
- Periods: Eliminates or reduces frequency
- Benefits: Reduce menstruation related symptoms, reduce risk of anemia

Extended or continuous cycle combined oral contraceptive pills are a packaging of combined oral contraceptive pills (COCPs) that reduce or eliminate the withdrawal bleeding that would occur once every 28 days in traditionally packaged COCPs. It works by reducing the frequency of the pill-free or placebo days. Extended cycle use of COCPs may also be called menstrual suppression, although other hormonal medications or medication delivery systems (hormonal intrauterine devices—IUDs) may also be used to suppress menses. Any brand of combined oral contraceptive pills can be used in an extended or continuous manner by simply discarding the placebo pills; this is most commonly done with monophasic pills in which all of the pills in a package contain the same fixed dosing of a synthetic estrogen and a progestin in each active pill.

Other combined hormonal contraceptives (those containing both an estrogen and a progestin) may also be used in an extended or continuous cycle. For example, the NuvaRing vaginal ring and the contraceptive patch have been studied for extended cycle use, and the monthly combined injectable contraceptive may similarly eliminate bleeding.

== History ==
Contraception means prevention of reproduction by artificial means. Before the advent of modern contraceptives, reproductive age women spent most of their time either pregnant or nursing. In modern Western society, women typically have about 450 periods during their lives, as compared to about 160 formerly.

Although it was evident that the pill could be used to suppress menstruation for arbitrary lengths of time, the original regimen was designed to produce withdrawal bleeding every four weeks to mimic the menstrual cycle.

There are three types of oral contraceptive pills—combined estrogen-progesterone, progesterone-only, and continuous or extended use pill.

== Usage ==
When a woman takes COCP, the hormones in the pills prevent both ovulation and shedding of the endometrium (menstruation). Traditionally, COCPs are packaged with 21 active (hormone-containing) pills and 7 placebo pills. During the week of placebo pills, withdrawal bleeding occurs and simulates an average 28-day menstrual cycle. The placebo pills are not required for pregnancy protection, and with any monophasic COCP the placebo pills may be discarded, and the next pack of active pills may be started to prevent the withdrawal bleeding. With bi- and tri-phasic pills, skipping the placebo week results in a sudden change in hormone levels, which may cause irregular spotting or flow. (Monophasic pills offer the same dose of estrogen and progestogen whereas multiphasic pills have varying doses from day to day; see formulations for details.)

Recently, several pharmaceutical companies have gained FDA approval to package COCPs for the intended use of reducing the frequency of or eliminating withdrawal bleeding.

The use of COCP is dependent on desirable effects and risk of adverse events with progestin component and dose of estrogen and progestin component.

- Estrogen component: Estradiol, Ethinylestradiol, or Estetrol
- First-generation progestin: Norethindrone acetate, Ethynodiol diacetate, Lynestrenol, Norethynodrel
- Second generation progestin: Levonorgestrel, dl-Norgestrel
- Third generation progestin: Norgestimate, Gestodene, Desogestrel
- Unclassified progestin: Drospirenone, Cyproterone acetate

== Clinical indications ==
Extended or continuous use of COCPs has been used for many years to treat endometriosis, dysmenorrhea, and menstruation-associated symptoms. Some studies have suggested that women who experience premenstrual-type symptoms during the placebo (hormone-free) week of traditionally packaged COCPs may experience significantly fewer symptoms when placed on extended cycle COCP regimens.

More recently, personal preference to avoid menstruation has also become a common reason for use. Personal preference is the most common reason extended cycle or continuous use COCPs are prescribed to adolescents. The Society for Menstrual Cycle Research holds that this use of COCPs does not have sufficient safety studies to justify promotion as a lifestyle choice (as opposed to medical indications), and criticizes what it perceives as negative portrayals of normal menstrual cycles in promotional literature for extended and continuous COCP use.

Women's satisfaction with their contraception, compliance in taking the pills on time, and discontinuation rates are not significantly different between traditional and extended cycle regimens. FDA has also formally approved combined pills for acne for specific brands.

Oral Contraceptive Pills are also effective in Hidradenitis Suppurativa. There is also limited evidence for benefit of Combined oral contraceptive pill (OCP) as treatment for primary dysmenorrhoea. The evidence from four RCTs is that combined OCPs with medium dose oestrogen and 1st/2nd generation progestogens are more effective than placebo, however the studies were small.

== Side effects ==
With all extended-cycle COCPs, breakthrough bleeding is the most common side effect, although it tends to decrease over time. In a 12-month study of a continuous COCP regimen, 59% of women experienced no bleeding in months six through twelve and 79% of women experienced no bleeding in month twelve. Extended or continuous use of COCPs or other combined hormonal contraceptives carries the same risk of side effects and medical risks as traditional COCP use.

Pill Failure can happen with contraceptive pills and inadvertent pregnancies happen.

Use of oral contraceptive can impair muscle gains in young women. The metabolic impact of oral contraceptives are significant and contraceptive pills can increase the risk of heart attacks. Many preclinical and clinical studies reveal that changes in lipoprotein metabolism are a major contributing factor to atherosclerosis.

There was also reported drug interactions between non-rifamycin antibiotics and hormonal contraception but it was not confirmed in a systematic review.

=== Ad campaign ===
One of the early extended-cycle COCPs, Seasonale, was marketed with the campaign, "Fewer periods. More possibilities." In December 2004, Barr Pharmaceuticals was warned by the FDA concerning these television advertisements. As the warning stated, "By omitting and minimizing the risks associated with Seasonale, the TV ad misleadingly suggests that Seasonale is safer than has been demonstrated by substantial evidence or substantial clinical experience." Although clinical studies had proven Seasonale to be effective in preventing pregnancy, the FDA felt the commercial advertisements omitted the common side effects of irregular vaginal bleeding or spotting.

== Brands ==
Seasonale is produced by Duramed Pharmaceuticals, a subsidiary of Barr Pharmaceuticals; Barr Pharmaceuticals also produces the same medicine as a generic called Jolessa. Quasense is the generic version produced by Watson Pharmaceuticals. Seasonale contains 30 micrograms of ethinylestradiol and 150 micrograms of levonorgestrel in each active pill. Seasonale reduces the frequency of menstrual periods from thirteen per year to four per year by changing the regimen of active pills from 21 to 84. Each package has 84 active pills and seven placebo pills to be taken at the end of the active cycle. It was first developed by Barr Pharmaceuticals, in collaboration with Eastern Virginia Medical School, under an agreement. The U.S. Food and Drug Administration (FDA) approved Seasonale in the United States on September 5, 2003. Barr Pharmaceuticals, its manufacturer, claimed at the time of Seasonale's approval that it would cost one dollar per pill. Health Canada approved Seasonale in July 2007, and Paladin Labs began distributing it in Canada on January 4, 2008.

Seasonique, also produced by Duramed Pharmaceuticals, has active pills and packaging identical to Seasonale, but replaces the placebo week with a low-dosage week of estrogen.

Lybrel is produced by Wyeth Pharmaceuticals. It contains 90 μg levonorgestrel and 20 μg ethinylestradiol in each pill, and is designed to be taken continuously with no placebos. The FDA approved Lybrel for human consumption on May 22, 2007.
