= Friedrich J. Haberlandt =

Austro-Hungarian scientist (1826–1878)

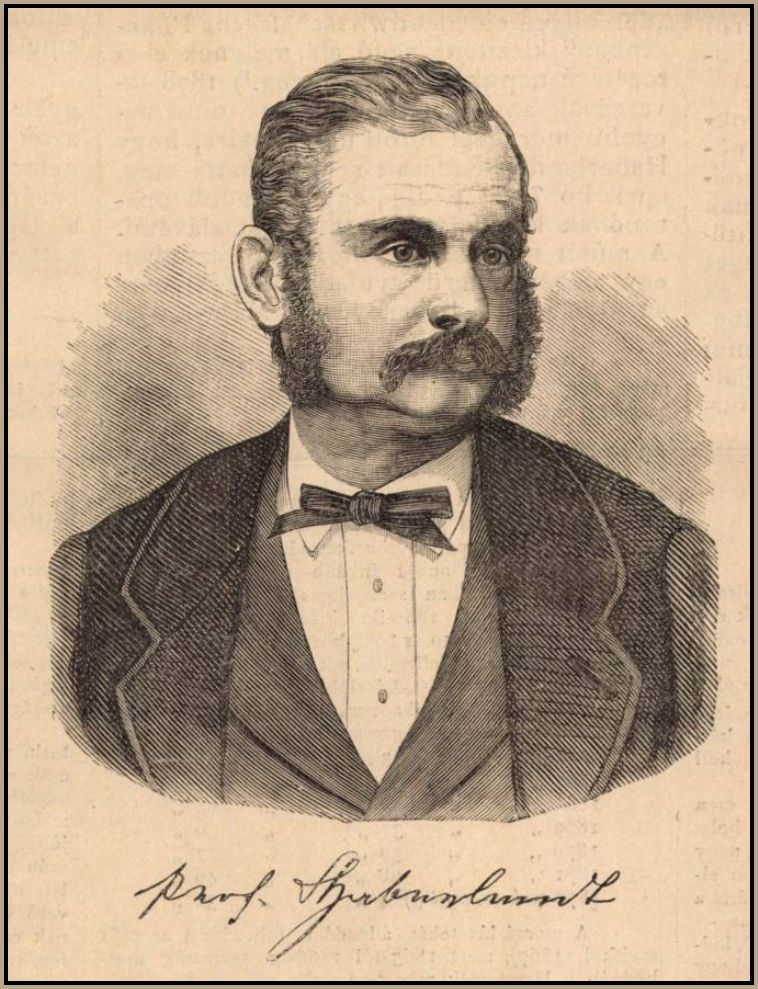

Friedrich J. Haberlandt (1826–1878) was a professor of agriculture at the Hochschule fuer Bodenkultur (Royal College of Agriculture) in Vienna, Austria-Hungary. He is best known for his book Die Sojabohne (The Soybean, 1878), which introduced soybean cultivation to Western and Central Europe.

== Early years ==
Friedrich Haberlandt was born on 21 February 1826 in Bratislava (known as Pressburg in German), in the Kingdom of Hungary (Transleithania). He studied at the agricultural college in Hungarian Altenberg (formerly Magyaróvár, today's Mosonmagyaróvár in Hungary) about 2 miles northwest of Győr where he was active from 1851 to 1853 as assistant professor and from 1853 to 1869 as professor.

He was the father of three sons and three daughters. One of his sons was the eminent botanist Gottlieb Haberlandt, plant tissue culture theorist and visionary. His grandson was Ludwig Haberlandt famed endocrinologist and pioneer in chemical birth control, the pill.

== Interest in soybeans ==
In 1873 Haberlandt first became interested in soybeans when he obtained the seeds of 19 soybean varieties at the Vienna World Exposition (Wiener Weltausstellung). At the time he was a professor at the Imperial-Royal College of Agriculture (k.k. Hochschule für Bodencultur) in Vienna. He cultivated these seeds in Vienna, and soon began to distribute them throughout Central and Western Europe. Most of the farmers who received seeds from him cultivated them, then reported their results back to him. Starting in Feb. 1876, he published these results first in various journal articles, and finally in his magnum opus, Die Sojabohne in 1878.

A biography of Friedrich Haberlandt and his work with soybeans (129 pages, 169 references) is now available online.

He died in 1878, at age 52, in the prime of his life. His untimely and premature death probably set back the interest in soybeans in Europe by at least 50 years.
