= Segesterone =

Chemical compound

Clinical data
- Other names: 17α-Hydroxy-16-methylene-19-norprogesterone; 16-Methylene-17α-hydroxy-19-norpregn-4-ene-3,20-dione; 17α-Deacetylnestorone

Identifiers
- IUPAC name: (8R,9S,10R,13S,14S,17R)-17-acetyl-17-hydroxy-13-methyl-16-methylidene-2,6,7,8,9,10,11,12,14,15-decahydro-1H-cyclopenta[a]phenanthren-3-one
- CAS Number: 7690-08-6
- PubChem CID: 11823650
- ChemSpider: 9998301
- UNII: 09Q5UV3747
- KEGG: D10987
- ChEMBL: ChEMBL2107778
- CompTox Dashboard (EPA): DTXSID00998190

Chemical and physical data
- Formula: C_{21}H_{28}O_{3}
- Molar mass: 328.452 g·mol^{−1}
- 3D model (JSmol): Interactive image
- SMILES: CC(=O)C1(C(=C)CC2C1(CCC3C2CCC4=CC(=O)CCC34)C)O
- InChI: InChI=1S/C21H28O3/c1-12-10-19-18-6-4-14-11-15(23)5-7-16(14)17(18)8-9-20(19,3)21(12,24)13(2)22/h11,16-19,24H,1,4-10H2,2-3H3/t16-,17+,18+,19-,20-,21-/m0/s1; Key:SFLXYFZGKSGFKA-XUDSTZEESA-N

Segesterone (INN, USAN), also known as 17α-hydroxy-16-methylene-19-norprogesterone or as 17α-deacetylnestorone, is a steroidal progestin of the 19-norprogesterone group that was never marketed. An acetate ester, segesterone acetate, better known as nestorone or elcometrine, is marketed for clinical use. Segesterone acetate produces segesterone as a metabolite.
