= Vaginal ring =

Medical device

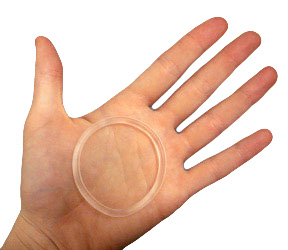
NuvaRing

Vaginal rings (also known as intravaginal rings, or V-Rings) are polymeric drug delivery devices designed to provide controlled release of drugs for intravaginal administration over extended periods of time. The ring is inserted into the vagina to provide contraception, HIV prophylaxis, or hormonal management depending on the specific product and the medicines it contains. Vaginal rings come in one size that fits most people.

== Types ==
Several vaginal ring products are available, including:

- Vaginal rings as treatment of peri-menopausal symptoms:
  - Estring - a low-dose estradiol-releasing ring, manufactured from silicone elastomer, for the treatment of vaginal atrophy (atrophic vaginitis).
  - Femring - a low-dose estradiol-acetate releasing ring, manufactured from silicone elastomer, for the relief of hot flashes and vaginal atrophy associated with menopause.
- Vaginal rings as contraception:
  - NuvaRing - a low-dose contraceptive vaginal ring, manufactured from poly(ethylene-co-vinyl acetate), and releasing etonogestrel (a progestin) and ethinylestradiol (an estrogen).
  - Progering - containing progesterone as a sole ingredient, is available only in Chile and Peru.
  - Annovera - a contraceptive vaginal ring, manufactured from methyl siloxane-based polymers, and releasing segesterone acetate (a progestin) and ethinylestradiol (an estrogen)

A number of other vaginal ring products are also in development.

== Contraception ==
The combined hormonal contraceptive vaginal ring is self-administered once a month. Leaving the ring in for three weeks slowly releases hormones into the body, mainly vaginally administered estrogens and/or progestogens (a group of hormones including progesterone) - the same hormones used in birth control pills. These hormones work mostly by stopping ovulation and thickening the cervical mucus, creating a barrier preventing sperm from fertilizing an egg. They could theoretically affect implantation but no evidence shows that they do. Worn continuously for three weeks followed by a week off, each vaginal ring provides anywhere from one month (NuvaRing) to one year (Annovera and Progering) of birth control. For continuous-use contraception, users can also choose to wear the vaginal ring for the full four week cycle. This manner of contraception will eliminate monthly periods. Throughout the additional week, the serum hormone levels will remain in the contraceptive range.

When compared with combined hormonal pills, the combined hormonal vaginal ring offers potentially better cycle control and treatment of heavy menstrual bleeding. However, both methods are effective short-term treatments in the reproductive age group. Vaginal rings may lead to increased normal vaginal secretions, decreased body weight, reduced symptoms of PMS, and occasionally cases of vaginitis, device-related problems and leukorrhea. Because they release estrogen, vaginal rings have an increased risk of heart attack, stroke, and other serious side effects. Additionally, certain medicines and supplements, such as the antibiotic rifampin, the anti-fungal griseofulvin, anti-seizure medicines, St. John's wort, and HIV medicines, may compromise the effectiveness of vaginal rings. Vaginal rings do not protect users from sexually transmitted diseases. The only contraceptive measures that do protect are latex or polyurethane condoms.

The contraceptive vaginal ring has a failure rate of 0.3% when used as prescribed and 9% when used typically.

The correlation between breast cancer and the use of vaginal rings is under investigation, but recent literature suggests that the hormones used in vaginal rings has little, if any, relation to the risk of developing breast cancer.

== Methods of use ==
Vaginal rings are easily inserted and removed. Vaginal walls hold them in place. Although their exact location within the vagina is not critical for clinical efficacy, rings commonly reside next to the cervix, and the deeper the placement in the vagina, the less likely the ring will be felt. Rings are typically left in place during intercourse, and most couples report no interference or discomfort. In many cases, neither partner feels the presence of the ring. Rings can be removed prior to intercourse, but, in the case of the contraceptive NuvaRing, only for one to three hours to maintain efficacy of birth control. If the ring is out for more than 48 hours, back up contraception is necessary for seven days. It typically takes between one and two months for a user's cycle to return to normal after the use of a vaginal ring is stopped.

- Estring - Estring is inserted into the vagina and left in place for three months, after which it is removed and replaced with a fresh ring.
- Femring - Femring is inserted into the vagina and left in place for three months, after which it is removed and replaced with a fresh ring.
- NuvaRing - NuvaRing is inserted into the vagina and left in place for three weeks, after which it is removed and discarded for a 'ring-free' week to allow menstruation to occur. At the end of that week, a new NuvaRing is inserted.
- Annovera - Annovera ring is inserted into the vagina and left in place for three weeks, after which it is removed for one week. Unlike the NuvaRing, users will reinsert the same Annovera Ring one week later. A single Annovera Ring is used for 3 week cycles for a total of 13 cycles.
