= Ethinylestradiol/etonogestrel =

Pharmaceutical birth control combination

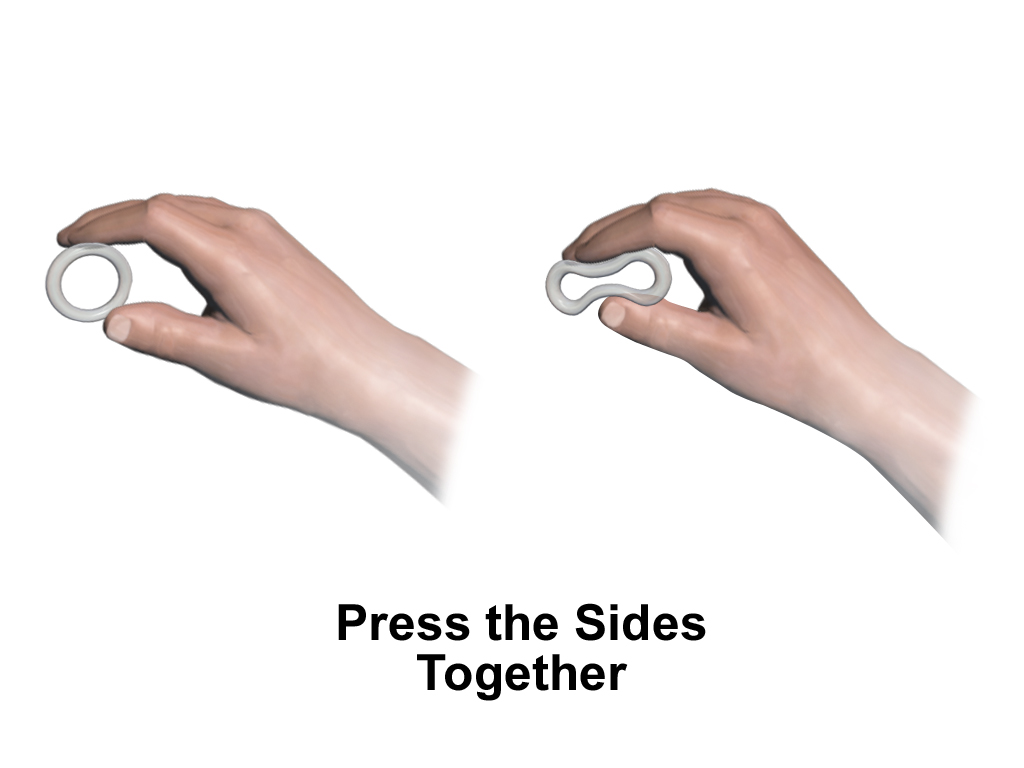
- Vaginal ring application (step 1)

Combination of
- Ethinylestradiol: Estrogen
- Etonogestrel: Progestogen

Clinical data
- Trade names: Nuvaring, others
- AHFS/Drugs.com: Monograph
- MedlinePlus: a604032
- License data: US DailyMed: Etonogestrel and ethinylestradiol
- Routes of administration: Vaginal (ring)
- ATC code: G02BB01 (WHO)

Legal status
- Legal status: CA: ℞-only; US: ℞-only

Identifiers
- CAS Number: 131562-74-8
- PubChem CID: 9960701
- ChemSpider: None
- KEGG: D11655

Ethinylestradiol/etonogestrel, sold under the brand name Nuvaring among others, is a hormonal vaginal ring used for birth control and to improve menstrual symptoms. It contains ethinylestradiol, an estrogen, and etonogestrel, a progestin. It is used by insertion into the vagina. Pregnancy occurs in about 0.3% of women with perfect use and 9% of women with typical use.

Common side effects include irregular vaginal bleeding, nausea, sore breasts, vaginitis, mood changes, and headache. Rare but serious side effects may include blood clots, toxic shock syndrome, anaphylaxis, gallstones, and liver problems. Use is not recommended in those who both smoke and are over the age of 35. While use in pregnancy is not recommended, such use has not been found to be harmful to the baby. Use during breastfeeding is typically not recommended as it may decrease the milk supply. It mainly works by decreasing gonadotropins thereby stopping ovulation.

The combination was approved for medical use in the United States in 2001. It is available as a generic medication in the United Kingdom. In 2023, it was the 170th most commonly prescribed medication in the United States, with more than 2 million prescriptions.

== Medical use ==
The ring is placed into the vagina for a three-week period, then removal of the ring for one week, during which the user will experience a menstrual period. The break week is comparable to the placebo week for combined oral birth control pills ("the Pill"), and the birth control effect is maintained during this period. Extended use regimens (seven-week, quarterly, or annual) involving back-to-back use of 2, 4, or 17 rings have been studied in clinical trials, but are not currently approved.

Insertion of the ring is comparable to insertion of other vaginal rings. The muscles of the vagina keep Nuvaring securely in place, even during exercise or sex. Women can check the birth control ring periodically with their finger. In rare instances, Nuvaring may fall out during sexual intercourse, while straining before or during a bowel movement, or while removing a tampon.

In the case of accidental expulsion, the manufacturer recommends rinsing the ring with tepid water before reinserting. If not done correctly, the risk of pregnancy is increased. Birth control efficacy is reduced if the ring is removed, accidentally expelled, or left outside of the vagina for more than three hours. If left outside of the vagina for more than three hours, the device must be rinsed and reinserted immediately. If this occurs, the manufacturer recommends that a backup method of birth control be used until the ring has been used continuously for a subsequent seven days.

=== Benefits ===
The benefits of the ring include:

- once-a-month self-administered use offering convenience, ease of use and privacy (most users and most partners do not feel the ring, and of those who do, most do not object to it)
- lower estrogen exposure than with combined oral contraceptive pills or the contraceptive patch Ortho Evra.
- a low incidence of estrogenic side effects such as nausea and breast tenderness
- a low incidence of irregular bleeding despite its lower estrogen dose

== Contraindications ==
The contraceptive vaginal ring is contraindicated for a risk of blood clots. This is because it contains the hormone etonogestrel, the active metabolite of the prodrug desogestrel. It is a third-generation contraceptive.

A study of more than 1.6 million women, found that users of vaginal rings with ethinylestradiol and etonogestrel have a 6.5 times increased risk of venous thrombosis compared with non-users. Epidemiological studies have shown that oral contraceptives that contain desogestrel can increase the risk of blood clots (venous thrombosis) by 1.5 to 2.4 times the risk of second-generation oral contraceptives. Second-generation oral contraceptives do not contain desogestrel. Hormones are released continuously from Nuvaring, thus peak and total estrogen and progestin doses are lower than with combined oral contraceptives, but what effect this has on the risk of blood clots has not been established.

Nuvaring also has the cardiovascular contraindications associated with combined oral contraceptives, such as stroke and heart attack. These risks have been shown to be much greater if combined with other risk factors such as smoking, recent surgery, a history of cardiovascular disease, or women over 40 years old.

Nuvaring should not be used while breastfeeding. The hormones may pass to the baby through the milk, and it may decrease milk production.

== Side effects ==
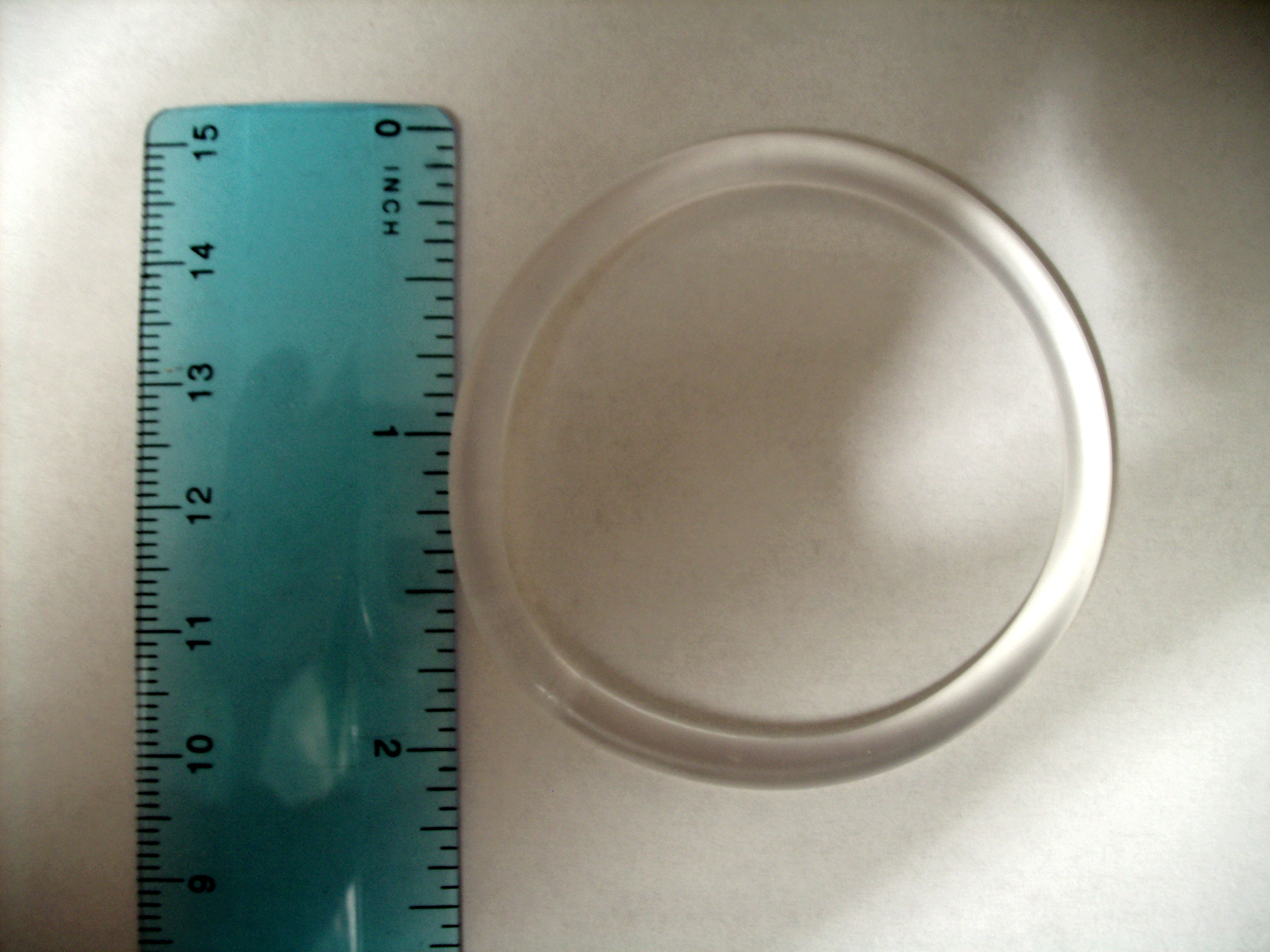
The Nuvaring, shown with a ruler for scale

In two studies, over a one-year period, 15.1% of users discontinued Nuvaring because of adverse events. Device-related adverse events (foreign object sensation, sexual problems, or expulsion) were the most frequently reported adverse events that led to discontinuation (by 2.5% of users). Device-related adverse events were reported at least once during the one-year study period by 4.4% of Nuvaring users.

The most common adverse events reported by 5 to 14% of the 2,501 women who used Nuvaring in five clinical trials were: vaginitis (14.1%), headache (9.8%), upper respiratory tract infection (8.0%), leukorrhea (5.8%), sinusitis (5.7%), nausea (5.2%), and weight gain (4.9%). Nuvaring is weight neutral. Additional side effect information (including, but not limited to, severe blood clots) is given in the Nuvaring full prescribing information. Breakthrough bleeding occurs in 2.0 to 6.4% of Nuvaring users.

=== Blood clots ===
The vaginal ring with ethinylestradiol and etonogestrel increases the risk of venous blood clots 6.5 times compared to non-users of hormonal birth control. This is similar to the risk of blood clots with combination birth control pills, which range between 3 times to 14 times the risk. As such, birth control vaginal rings do not necessarily appear to pose a lower risk of thrombosis than do birth control pills. Additionally pregnancy and the period immediately following pregnancy is associated with a high risk of blood clots.

== Mechanism of action ==
Like all combined hormonal contraceptives, Nuvaring works primarily by preventing ovulation. A secondary mechanism of action is inhibition of sperm penetration by changes in the cervical mucus. Hormonal contraceptives also have effects on the endometrium that theoretically could affect implantation; however, no scientific evidence indicates that prevention of implantation actually results from their use. Nuvaring should not be used if a woman is pregnant.

Nuvaring delivers 120 μg of etonogestrel (a progestin) and 15 μg of ethinylestradiol (an estrogen) each day of use.

== Society and culture ==
=== Restrictions on use ===
In July 2014, CTV News reported that Merck Canada Inc. stated that women who are over 35 and smoke should not use the Nuvaring. In addition to this group of women, women who have any of the following conditions also should not use the Nuvaring: abnormal blood-fat levels, clotting disorders, diabetes, heart disease, high blood pressure, migraine headaches with vision problems or "constant stomach pain caused by pancreatic dysfunction along with high levels of fats in the blood".

=== Lawsuits ===
Lawsuits were filed in the US against Merck alleging it concealed health risks associated with the product. These were settled for $100 million in 2014.

In March 2008, the first lawsuit was filed against the manufacturers, distributors, and marketers of Nuvaring. The plaintiff alleged that these companies concealed the health risks associated with using the device, which is claimed to have caused the death of the plaintiff's wife. Subsequent plaintiffs alleged multiple problems with the advertising of Nuvaring and that they downplayed its risks of injury and death. The company denied these allegations.

The first bellwether trial, selected from a pool of federal lawsuits, was scheduled to begin in April 2014. In February 2014, however, Merck & Co announced that it was ready to settle the Nuvaring lawsuits for $100 million. At that time, there were more than 1,850 lawsuits and the settlement was initially estimated pay about $58,000 per complaint. Approval of the settlement required 95% of the plaintiffs to agree to settle in March 2014, otherwise Merck could retract their offer. In June 2014, US District Judge Rodney W. Sippel approved the $100 million settlement. About 3,800 claimants would share the settlement.

== History ==
Nuvaring was first approved in The Netherlands in February 2001, then by the European Union in June 2001, and in the United States by the US Food and Drug Administration (FDA) in October 2001.

Nuvaring was first marketed in the United States in July 2002, followed by a number European countries since then.

== Research ==
A study by Danish researcher Dr. Øjvind Lidegaard in 2012 with 1.6 million women found a 6.5 times increase in the likelihood of venous thromboembolism when compared to users of non-hormonal based birth control. In Canada, Lidegaard's study led to a change in labeling warning of increased risk of blood clots, but not in the United States.

== See also ==
- Combined injectable contraceptive
- Contraceptive patch
- Oral contraceptive formulations
- List of combined sex-hormonal preparations
