= Contraceptive vaginal ring =

Birth control device

NuvaRing
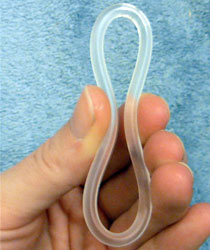
- NuvaRing is a flexible plastic ring with both oestrogen and progesterone.

Background
- Type: Hormonal
- First use: 2001

Failure rates (first year)
- Perfect use: 0.3 for Nuvaring%
- Typical use: 1.5 to 9 for Nuvaring%

Usage
- Duration effect: 4 weeks for Nuvaring, 3 months for progesterone only vaginal ring
- User reminders: Inserted for 3 weeks and then removed for 7 days for Nuvaring
- Clinic review: Annual

Advantages and disadvantages
- STI protection: No
- Weight: No proven effect
- Benefits: Easy insertion and removal

A contraceptive vaginal ring is a type of hormonal insert that is placed in the vagina for the purpose of birth control. The rings themselves utilize a plastic polymer matrix that is inlaid or embedded with contraceptive drug. This drug, often one or two hormones, is absorbed directly through the bloodstream through the cells that line the vaginal wall. Some vaginal rings contain both an estrogen and a progestin (brand names NuvaRing and Annovera, which are available in Europe and the United States). Other vaginal rings contain just progesterone (brand name Progering). The progesterone-only ring is only available in Latin America, exclusively for postpartum breastfeeding parents.

The Progering is made of silicone-elastorone with an outer diameter of 58 mm and cross-sectional diameter of 8.4 mm. Similarly, Annovera has an outer diameter of 56 mm and cross-sectional diameter of 8.4 mm. In contrast, the Nuvaring has a diameter of 54 mm with a cross-sectional diameter that measures 4 mm. The vaginal rings work as a long acting drug delivery system for varying indications, including prevention of pregnancy, improvement of dysmenorrhea and menorrhagia, lower risks of ovarian and endometrial cancers, and reduction of risk of cysts in the ovaries. Although the vaginal rings do not provide protection for sexually transmitted diseases, the rings are being assessed as a possible drug delivery system for HIV prevention.

== Combined hormonal contraceptive vaginal ring ==
=== Mechanism of action ===
The ethinylestradiol/etonogestrel vaginal ring is also known as NuvaRing. It is a flexible plastic (ethylene-vinyl acetate copolymer) ring that releases a low dose of a progestin and estrogen over three weeks. The slow release of the hormones prevents pregnancy by blocking ovulation and causes changes in the cervical mucus that may stop implantation from occurring, as well.

=== Dosing ===
The low dose is a constant rate that averages to about 0.015 mg of ethinyl estradiol and 0.12 mg etonogestrel per day.

=== Administration ===
The contraceptive vaginal ring can be used at any time during the menstrual cycle as long as the patient is not currently pregnant. The standard process for administration is to insert the ring and leave it inside the vagina for 21 days, then remove it and have a break for 7 days without the ring inserted. After the 7 day break, a new ring should be reinserted for a 21 day period, and the cycle will continue thereafter. However, some patients may choose to have a shorter ring-free break or no break at all, which has been shown to be just as safe and effective as the regimen with breaks. About 9% of individuals using a vaginal ring will still get pregnant every year, although this drops to 1% with perfect use. The most common mistakes when using the ring are adherence issues and incorrect administration, including forgetting to replace the ring on time and failure to insert the ring far enough into the vagina. A study in Kenya demonstrated that there was concern circling on vaginal insertion and ring placement that called for practice from users, initially. Comparably, in Rwanda participants, there were challenges with ring insertion and removal originally but those worries dissipated with practice, and later described the process as "easy". Multiple other common reasons for nonadherence include removing the ring for washing or before sexual intercourse. If the ring has been removed for more than three hours, then backup contraception should be used until the ring has been inserted and back in place for at least seven days. Due to lack of patient education, some users struggle to insert the device comfortably and completely, which may hinder the contraceptive effects of the ring. A large number of accidental expulsion of the vaginal ring occurs in the first few weeks of ring use, further suggesting inadequate or absence of counseling in use of contraceptive vaginal rings or inexperience in vaginal ring use.

Annovera

Background
- Type: Hormonal Vaginal
- First use: 2018

Effective rates (first year)
- Perfect use: 97%
- Typical use: 93%

Usage
- Duration effect: 4 weeks
- User reminders: Insert & leave in for 3 weeks, remove for 1 week within menstrual cycle

Advantages and disadvantages
- STI protection: No
- Safe while breastfeeding: No
- Weight: No proven effect
- Benefits: Easy insertion and removal

=== Side effects ===
For any individual interested in using a contraceptive vaginal ring, it is important for their healthcare provider to provide counseling and support their understanding on these topics to ensure proper usage techniques and time. There is a small chance of blood clots, heart attacks and stroke with vaginal rings, and they are not recommended for individuals over 35 who smoke. Studies find that 2.4% to 6.4% of contraceptive vaginal ring users experience uterine bleeding.

A common concern with contraceptive vaginal rings are that they will impact vaginal health. Multiple studies have demonstrated that vaginal health is not impacted as contraceptive vaginal rings do not affect the vaginal microbiome. However, adverse effects that can lead to discontinuation of vaginal ring use include foreign body sensation, coital problems, and expulsion of the device.

The one-year combined hormonal contraceptive ring is also known as Annovera. It is a silicone elastomer vaginal ring containing the progestin segesterone acetate and the estrogen ethinylestradiol.

Side effects are not common but may be present in some patients as a result of the hormones released by the ring. These side effects could include headaches, nausea, changes in period/menstrual cycle, sore breasts, or increased vaginal discharge. These symptoms are most common when the patient first begins using the ring and often subside within the first 2–3 months. While these are not necessarily reasons for concern, patients should always contact their primary care provider if they feel sick or faint, as it may be a sign for more serious adverse events in which case the vaginal ring usage should be discontinued.

== Progesterone only vaginal ring ==
=== Indications ===
A progesterone vaginal ring (PVR) has also been developed. It is specifically made for use during breastfeeding as it does not affect milk production. The progesterone rings are highly effective for breastfeeding parents because exclusive breastfeeding itself, inducing lactational amenorrhea, provides some protection from pregnancy, and is considered safe for the new infants.

=== Mechanism of action ===
The progesterone vaginal ring works by releasing a hormone, progesterone, over a three month period that leads to prevention of ovulation in the first postpartum year. After the three months, the ring can be replaced with a new one if breastfeeding is continued or if prolonged contraception is desired.

=== Dosing ===
Approximately 10 mg of progesterone diffuses from the ring per day through the vaginal walls into the bloodstream to suppress ovulation as well as thickening the cervical mucus to prevent sperm penetration into the uterus.

=== Administration ===
Similar to the combined hormonal ring, the progesterone vaginal ring should be left in place and should not be removed for a period longer than two hours. If it is removed for a longer period of time, backup contraception should be used until the ring has been inserted and back in place for at least seven days.

The effectiveness rate is 98 to 99% in individuals using the progesterone vaginal ring for a year.

=== Side effects ===
Side effects include, but are not limited to, vaginal discharge, breast pain, and spotting or irregular bleeding.

== Advantages and disadvantages ==
Since the vaginal ring is a different form of birth control, there are certain advantages and disadvantages when compared to other forms.

=== Advantages ===
The ring offers better adherence from its longer duration effect as it needs to be changed at the very most once a month, compared to taking contraceptive pills daily. Also, unlike the pill, it is not affected by gastrointestinal issues, such as vomiting and diarrhea, as the hormones are directly absorbed into the bloodstream. The estrogen dosing is lower compared to that of contraceptive pills and patches, which results in fewer side effects related to estrogen. Additionally, there are a lower incidence rates of drug-drug interactions because the route does not involve the gastrointestinal tract, but rather the vaginal epithelium. In a 2014 study conducted in Chilean individuals, a positive correlation between contraceptive counseling and preference for contraceptive vaginal rings has been demonstrated. Preferences for an oral pill formulation, which was the most popular option, decreased after physician counseling; whereas, preferences for vaginal rings and transdermal patches increased after physician counseling. When compared to other forms of contraception (combined oral contraceptives, contraceptive patch), the contraceptive vaginal ring showed similar, comparable efficacy and a better safety profile than its competitors. Oral contraceptive users experienced more adverse events of nausea and vomiting. However on the other hand, vaginal ring users experienced more vaginal discharge. The study found that adherence was far higher for contraceptive vaginal rings as they did not need to be changed daily like the other forms of contraception. This provides a good indication for real world effectiveness of vaginal rings as the primary source of contraception, as adherence issues are the main source of contraceptive failures. An additional benefit is that the bleeding pattern of the contraceptive vaginal ring is consistent over a year long period, which has led to lower discontinuation rates.

=== Disadvantages ===
Though it requires less maintenance, the vaginal ring will still have to be placed and removed at the right time. A prescription is required to obtain a vaginal ring, which makes it less accessible compared to over the counter contraceptives. The vaginal ring does not offer protection against all sexually transmitted infections. The dapivirine vaginal ring (DPV-VR) is a relatively recent type of vaginal ring that reduces the risk of acquiring HIV during vaginal sex, with further research attempting to create a contraceptive and HIV preventative vaginal ring. Unscheduled ring removals can increase the risk of failure, and further studies are needed to evaluate the efficacy of the ring beyond a 21-day period.

=== Contraindications ===
In addition, due to the higher risk of thromboembolism, the vaginal ring is not suitable for individuals with the following conditions:

- severe obesity
- history of thromboembolic episodes
- history of breast cancer, hepatitis, stroke, heart attack, irregular vaginal bleeding, or migraines of certain types
- smoking, especially 15 or more cigarettes per day
- over 35 years of age
- concurrent use of medications such as St. John's Wort, rifampin, or corticosteroids
