= Etynodiol =

Chemical compound

Clinical data
- Other names: Ethynodiol; 3β-Hydroxynorethisterone; 17α-Ethynylestr-4-ene-3β,17β-diol
- Drug class: Progestin; Progestogen
- ATC code: G03DC06 (WHO)

Identifiers
- IUPAC name: (3S,8R,9S,10R,13S,14S,17R)-17-ethynyl-13-methyl-2,3,6,7,8,9,10,11,12,14,15,16-dodecahydro-1H-cyclopenta[a]phenanthrene-3,17-diol
- CAS Number: 1231-93-2
- ChemSpider: 14017
- UNII: 9E01C36A9S
- CompTox Dashboard (EPA): DTXSID1023025
- ECHA InfoCard: 100.013.610

Chemical and physical data
- Formula: C_{20}H_{28}O_{2}
- Molar mass: 300.442 g·mol^{−1}
- 3D model (JSmol): Interactive image
- SMILES: O[C@@H]4/C=C3\[C@@H]([C@H]2CC[C@]1([C@@H](CC[C@]1(C#C)O)[C@@H]2CC3)C)CC4
- InChI: InChI=1S/C20H28O2/c1-3-20(22)11-9-18-17-6-4-13-12-14(21)5-7-15(13)16(17)8-10-19(18,20)2/h1,12,14-18,21-22H,4-11H2,2H3/t14-,15-,16+,17+,18-,19-,20-/m0/s1; Key:JYILPERKVHXLNF-QMNUTNMBSA-N

Etynodiol, or ethynodiol, is a steroidal progestin of the 19-nortestosterone group which was never marketed. A diacylated derivative, etynodiol diacetate, is used as a hormonal contraceptive. Etynodiol is sometimes used as a synonym for etynodiol diacetate.

It was patented in 1955.

== Pharmacology ==
Etynodiol is a prodrug of norethisterone, and is converted immediately and completely into norethisterone. Etynodiol is an intermediate in the conversion of the prodrug lynestrenol into norethisterone.

Relative affinities (%) of norethisterone, metabolites, and prodrugs
Compound	Type^{a}	PR	AR	ER	GR	MR	SHBG	CBG
Norethisterone	–	67–75	15	0	0–1	0–3	16	0
5α-Dihydronorethisterone	Metabolite	25	27	0	0	?	?	?
3α,5α-Tetrahydronorethisterone	Metabolite	1	0	0–1	0	?	?	?
3α,5β-Tetrahydronorethisterone	Metabolite	?	0	0	?	?	?	?
3β,5α-Tetrahydronorethisterone	Metabolite	1	0	0–8	0	?	?	?
Ethinylestradiol	Metabolite	15–25	1–3	112	1–3	0	0.18	0
Norethisterone acetate	Prodrug	20	5	1	0	0	?	?
Norethisterone enanthate	Prodrug	?	?	?	?	?	?	?
Noretynodrel	Prodrug	6	0	2	0	0	0	0
Etynodiol	Prodrug	1	0	11–18	0	?	?	?
Etynodiol diacetate	Prodrug	1	0	0	0	0	?	?
Lynestrenol	Prodrug	1	1	3	0	0	?	?
Notes: Values are percentages (%). Reference ligands (100%) were promegestone for the PR, metribolone for the AR, estradiol for the ER, dexamethasone for the GR, aldosterone for the MR, dihydrotestosterone for SHBG, and cortisol for CBG. Footnotes: ^{a} = Active or inactive metabolite, prodrug, or neither of norethisterone. Sources: See template.

== Chemistry ==
Etynodiol is a 19-nortestosterone derivative. Structurally, it is almost identical to norethisterone and lynestrenol, differing only in its C3 substituent. Whereas norethisterone has a ketone at C3 and lynestrenol has no substituent at C3, etynodiol has a hydroxyl group at the position.

=== Synthesis ===
Ethynodiol diacetate synthesis: F. B. Colton, U.S. patent 2,843,609 (1958 to Searle). Prepn of the 3-acetate, 17-acetate, and diacetate: P. D. Klimstra, U.S. patent 3,176,013 (1965 to Searle); see also:

== Society and culture ==
=== Generic names ===
Etynodiol is the generic name of the drug and its INN, while ethynodiol is its BAN.
