= Birth control pill formulations =

Ingredients of oral contraceptives

Birth control pills come in a variety of formulations. The main division is between combined oral contraceptive pills, containing both estrogens and synthetic progestogens (progestins), and progestogen only pills. Combined oral contraceptive pills also come in varying types, including varying doses of estrogen, and whether the dose of estrogen or progestogen changes from week to week.

== Mechanism of action ==
Combination pills usually work by preventing the ovaries from releasing eggs (ovulation). They also thicken the cervical mucus, which keeps sperm from penetrating into the uterus and joining with an egg. The hormones in combination and progestogen-only pills also thin the lining of the uterus. This could prevent pregnancy by interfering with implantation of a blastocyst.

Main action in typical use is prevention of ovulation.

== Combined oral contraceptive pills ==
All contain an estrogen, ethinylestradiol or mestranol, in varying amounts, and one of a number of different progestogens. (Regarding the estrogen, the inactive 3-methyl ether of ethinylestradiol, which must be metabolized by the liver into the active ethinylestradiol; 50 μg of mestranol is equivalent to only 35 μg of ethinylestradiol and should not be used when high-dose [50 μg ethinylestradiol] estrogen pills are needed; mestranol was the estrogen used in the first oral contraceptive, Enovid). They are usually taken for 21 days with then a seven-day gap during which a withdrawal bleed (often, but incorrectly, referred to as a menstrual period) occurs. These differ in the amount of estrogen given, and whether they are monophasic (the same dose of estrogen and progestogen during each of the 21 days) or multiphasic (varying doses). The introduction of extended-cycle monophasic pills (i.e. Seasonale) has shown that the withdrawal bleeding intervals can be decreased.

In 2023, the combination ethinylestradiol/norgestrel was the 282nd most commonly prescribed medication in the United States, with more than 700,000 prescriptions.

=== Monophasic ===
These are typically given as 21 tablets of estrogen and progestogen, followed by seven tablets of placebo or an iron supplement, although some newer formulations contain more active tablets and fewer placebos. Everyday regimens (Microgynon 30 ED, Femodene ED, Logynon ED), which include seven inactive placebo pills, are rarely used in UK practice. Different formulations contain different amounts of estrogen and progestogen:

- 15 μg ethinylestradiol
  - 60 μg gestodene: 24 days + 4 days placebo (Spain: Melodene-15; Israel: Minesse)
- 20 μg ethinylestradiol
  - 1000 μg norethisterone acetate (UK: Loestrin 20, Galen; US: Loestrin 1/20, Duramed; Microgestin 1/20, Watson Pharmaceuticals; Junel 1/20, Barr)
  - 1000 μg norethisterone acetate: 24 days + 4 days ferrous fumarate only (US: Loestrin 24 Fe, Warner Chilcott)
  - 90 μg levonorgestrel: continuous: 365 days/year, no placebo (US: Amethyst, Watson)
  - 100 μg levonorgestrel: extended cycle: 84 days + 7 days 10 μg ethinylestradiol only (US: LoSeasonique, Teva; CamreseLo, Teva)
  - 100 μg levonorgestrel (US: Alesse, Wyeth; Aviane, Barr; Lessina, Barr; Lutera, Watson; Sronyx, Watson)
  - 150 μg desogestrel (UK: Mercilon, Organon; HU: Novynette, Richter Gedeon)
  - 75 μg gestodene (UK: Femodette, Bayer; RU: Logest, Bayer; Brazil: Femiane, Bayer)
  - 3000 μg drospirenone: 24 days + 4 days placebo (US, EU, RU: Yaz; Bayer Schering Pharma AG. Cleonita); 21 days + 7 days placebo (US, EU: Yasminelle, Bayer); 24 days + 4 days placebo and levomefolate calcium (RU: Yaz Plus, US: Beyaz; Bayer)
- 30 μg ethinylestradiol
  - 1500 μg norethisterone acetate (UK: Loestrin 30, Galen; US: Loestrin 1.5/30, Duramed; Microgestin 1.5/30, Watson; Junel 1.5/30, Barr)
  - 300 μg norgestrel (US: Lo/Ovral, Wyeth; Low-Ogestrel, Watson; Cryselle, Barr)
  - 150 μg levonorgestrel (UK: Ovranette, Wyeth; Microgynon 30, Microgynon 30 ED, Bayer; US: Nordette, Duramed, Levora, Watson, Portia, Barr)
  - 150 μg levonorgestrel: 21 day cycle + 7 days no pills (Canada: Min-Ovral 21; EU: Ovoplex 150/30; Sweden: Neovletta, Prionelle)
  - 150 μg levonorgestrel: 21 day cycle + 7 days placebo (Canada: Min-Ovral 28; Sweden: Prionelle 28; RU: Rigevidon 21+7, Richter Gedeon)
  - 150 μg levonorgestrel: extended cycle: 84 days + 7 days placebo (US: Seasonale, Duramed; Quasense, Watson; Jolessa, Barr, Introvale)
  - 150 μg levonorgestrel: extended cycle: 84 days + 7 days 10 μg ethinylestradiol only (US: Seasonique, Duramed; Camrese, Teva; Amethia, Watson)
  - 75 μg gestodene (UK: Femodene, Femodene ED, Bayer; Minulet, Wyeth; RU: Femoden, Jenapharm)
  - 150 μg desogestrel (AU, EU, RU, UK: Marvelon, BR: Microdiol, US: Desogen, MSD; US: Ortho-Cept, Ortho-McNeil; RU: Regulon, Richter Gedeon)
  - 3000 μg drospirenone (AU, EU, US: Yasmin, FR: Jasmine, RU: Yarina, Bayer Schering Pharma AG); with levomefolate calcium (US: Safyral, Bayer Schering Pharma AG)
  - 2000 μg chlormadinone acetate (EU: Belara, Benelux: Bellina; Gedeon Richter)
  - 2000 μg dienogest (AU, EU: Valette, RU: Jeanine, Bayer Schering Pharma AG; RU: Siluet, Gedeon Richter)
- 35 μg ethinylestradiol
  - 400 μg norethisterone: chewable, spearmint flavor (US: Femcon Fe, Warner Chilcott)
  - 400 μg norethisterone (US: Ovcon 35, Warner Chilcott; Balziva, Barr)
  - 500 μg norethisterone (UK: Ovysmen, Janssen-Cilag; Brevinor, Pfizer; US: Modicon, Ortho-McNeil; Brevicon, Watson; Nortrel 0.5/35, Barr)
  - 1000 μg norethisterone (AU, CAN: Synphasic, Pfizer; UK: Norimin, Pfizer; US: Ortho-Novum 1/35, Ortho-McNeil; Norinyl 1/35, Watson; Necon, Watson; Nortrel 1/35, Barr)
  - 1000 μg etynodiol diacetate (US: Demulen 1/35, Pfizer; Zovia 1/35, Watson; Kelnor, Barr)
  - 250 μg norgestimate (UK: Cilest, Janssen-Cilag; US: Ortho Cyclen, Ortho-McNeil; MonoNessa, Watson; Sprintec, Barr; Sweden: Amorest)
  - 2000 μg cyproterone acetate: only approved for severe acne or severe hirsutism in the UK (AU, RU: Diane-35, UK: Dianette, Bayer)
- 50 μg mestranol (equivalent to 35 μg ethinylestradiol)
  - 1000 μg norethisterone (UK: Norinyl-1, Pfizer; US: Ortho-Novum 1/50; Ortho-McNeil; Norinyl 1/50, Watson; Necon 1/50, Watson)
- 50 μg ethinylestradiol
  - 1000 μg norethisterone (US: Ovcon 50, Warner Chilcott)
  - 1000 μg etynodiol diacetate (US: Demulen 1/50, Pfizer; Zovia 1/50, Watson)
  - 500 μg norgestrel (US: Ogestrel, Watson)
  - 250 μg levonorgestrel (US: Nordiol, Wyeth)
- 1.5 mg estradiol (as hemihydrate)
  - 2.5 mg nomegestrol acetate: 24-day cycle + 4 placebo pills (AU, EU, RU: Zoely, MSD)
- 15 mg estetrol monohydrate (equivalent to 14.2 mg estetrol)
  - 3 mg drospirenone: 24-day cycle + 4 inactive pills (US, CAN: Nextstellis, Mayne, EU: Drovelis, Gedeon Richter Plc., EU: Lydisilka, Estetra SRL)

=== Multiphasic ===
- 25 μg ethinylestradiol: triphasic
  - ethinylestradiol/norgestimate combination with 7 tablets 25 μg/180 μg, 7 tablets 25 μg/215 μg, 7 tablets 25 μg/250 μg followed by 7 placebos (Ortho Tri-Cyclen Lo from Ortho-McNeil, Tri-Lo Sprintec back from Teva, Tri-Lo Marzia from Lupin, and norgestimate/ethinylestradiol from Mylan)
  - ethinylestradiol/desogestrel combination with 7 tablets 25 μg/100 μg, 7 tablets 25 μg/125 μg, 7 tablets 25 μg/150 μg, followed by 7 tablets of ferric oxide (US: Cyclessa, Organon; Velivet, Barr)
- 20/30/35 μg ethinylestradiol: estrophasic
  - ethinylestradiol/norethisterone acetate combination with 5 tablets 20 μg/1000 μg, 7 tablets 30 μg/1000 μg, 9 tablets 35 μg/1000 μg, followed by 7 tablets of ferrous fumarate 75 mg (US: Estrostep Fe, Warner Chilcott)
- 35/30/30 μg ethinylestradiol: triphasic
  - ethinylestradiol/desogestrel combination with 7 tablets 35 μg/50 μg, 7 tablets 30 μg/100 μg, 7 tablets 30 μg/150 μg (RU: Tri-Merci, Organon)
- 30/40/30 μg ethinylestradiol: triphasic
  - ethinylestradiol/levonorgestrel combination with 6 tablets 30 μg/50 μg, 5 tablets 40 μg/75 μg, 10 tablets 30 μg/125 μg (UK: Trinordiol, Wyeth; Logynon, Logynon ED, Bayer; US: Triphasil, Wyeth; Trivora, Watson; Enpresse, Barr)
  - ethinylestradiol/gestodene combination with 6 tablets 30 μg/50 μg, 5 tablets 40 μg/70 μg, 10 tablets 30 μg/100 μg (UK: Triadene, Bayer; Tri-Minulet, Wyeth)
- 35 μg ethinylestradiol: triphasic
  - ethinylestradiol/norethisterone combination with 7 tablets 35 μg/500 μg, 9 tablets 35 μg/1000 μg, 5 tablets 35 μg/500 μg (UK: Synphase, Pfizer; US: Tri-Norinyl, Watson; Leena, Watson)
  - ethinylestradiol/norethisterone combination with 7 tablets 35 μg/500 μg, 7 tablets 35 μg/750 μg, 7 tablets 35 μg/1000 μg (UK: TriNovum, Janssen-Cilag; US: Ortho-Novum 7/7/7, Ortho-McNeil; Necon 7/7/7, Watson; Nortrel 7/7/7, Barr)
  - ethinylestradiol/norgestimate combination with 7 tablets 35 μg/180 μg, 7 tablets 35 μg/215 μg, 7 tablets 35 μg/250 μg followed by 7 placebos (Ortho Tri-Cyclen, Ortho-McNeil; TriNessa, Watson; Tri-Sprintec, Barr)
- 35 μg ethinylestradiol: biphasic
  - ethinylestradiol/norethisterone combination with 10 tablets 35 μg/500 μg, 11 tablets 35 μg/1000 μg, followed by 7 placebos (US: Ortho-Novum 10/11, Ortho-McNeil; Necon 10/11, Watson)
  - ethinylestradiol/norethisterone combination with 7 tablets 35 μg/500 μg, 14 tablets 35 μg/1000 μg (UK: BiNovum, Janssen-Cilag)

- 3/2/1 mg estradiol valerate: estrophasic
  - estradiol valerate/dienogest combination with 2 tablets 3 mg/0 mg, followed by 5 tablets 2 mg/2 mg, 17 tablets 2 mg/3 mg, 2 tablets 1 mg/0 mg, and 2 placebos. (AU, EU, RU: Qlaira, US: Natazia, Bayer)

== Progestogen-only pills ==
Progestogen-only pills (POPs) use a progestogen alone with doses taken continuously and no or a short gap between packs taken. People who use them may experience irregular light bleeds, and whilst irregular in the first few months of taking, usually settles to a regular pattern in time.

The following progestogens are used:

- 350 μg norethisterone (norethindrone) (UK: Micronor, Janssen-Cilag; Noriday, Pfizer; US: Micronor, Ortho-McNeil; Nor-QD, Watson; Nora-BE, Watson; Jolivette, Watson; Camila, Barr; Errin, Barr; Heather, Glenmark; RU: Primolut-Nor, Bayer; Norkolut, Richter Gedeon)
- 4 mg drospirenone (Slynd)
- 75 μg desogestrel (UK: Cerazette, Loestrin; RU: Cerazette, Organon; Lactinette, Richter Gedeon; SE: Gestrina)
- 30 μg levonorgestrel (UK: Norgeston, Bayer; AUS, RU: Microlut, Bayer)
- 500 μg etynodiol diacetate (UK: Femulen, Pfizer)
- 500 μg lynestrenol (RU: Exluton, Organon)
- 75 μg norgestrel (US: Opill, Perrigo)

== Contraindications ==
Generally oral contraceptives should not be used in people who currently have the following conditions:

- Thrombophlebitis or thromboembolic disorders
- A history of deep vein thrombophlebitis or thromboembolic disorders
- Cerebrovascular or coronary artery disease (current or history)
- Valvular heart disease with thrombogenic complications
- Severe hypertension
- Diabetes with vascular involvement
- Headaches with focal neurological symptoms
- Major surgery with prolonged immobilization
- Known or suspected carcinoma of the breast or personal history of breast cancer
- Carcinoma of the endometrium or other known or suspected estrogen-dependent neoplasia
- Undiagnosed abnormal genital bleeding
- Cholestatic jaundice of pregnancy or jaundice with prior pill use
- Hepatic adenomas or carcinomas, or active liver disease
- Known or suspected pregnancy
- Hypersensitivity to any component of the product

More comprehensive guidelines that include analysis of risks and benefits can be found in the World Health Organization Medical Eligibility for Contraceptive Use Guidelines which are reflected in the CDC Medical Eligibility for Contraceptive Use Guidelines.

== See also ==
- Mestranol/noretynodrel (Enovid)—the first oral contraceptive
- List of progestogens available in the United States
- List of estrogens available in the United States
