= Progestogen-only pill =

Type of contraceptive pill

Background
- Type: Hormonal
- First use: 1968

Failure rates (first year)
- Perfect use: 0.3%
- Typical use: 9%

Usage
- Duration effect: 1 day
- Reversibility: Yes
- User reminders: Taken within same 3-hour window each day
- Clinic review: 6 months

Advantages and disadvantages
- STI protection: No
- Weight: No proven effect
- Period disadvantages: Light spotting may be irregular
- Period advantages: Often lighter and less painful

Medical notes
- Unaffected by being on most (but not all) antibiotics. May be used, unlike COCPs, in patients with hypertension and history of migraines. Affected by some anti-epileptics.

Progestogen-only pills (POPs), colloquially known as "mini pills", are a type of oral contraceptive that contain synthetic progestogens (progestins) and do not contain estrogens. They are primarily used for the prevention of undesired pregnancy, although additional medical uses also exist.

Progestogen-only pills differ from combined oral contraceptive pills (COCPs), which consist of a combination of progestins and estrogens.

== Terminology ==
Progestogen-only pills, progestin-only pills, and progesterone-only pills refer to the same class of synthetic hormone medications. The phrase progestogen-only pill is used by the World Health Organization and much of the international medical community. The phrase progestin-only pills is typically used in the United States and Canada.

Despite sometimes being referred to as progesterone-only pills, these medications do not contain progesterone but instead one of several chemically related compounds. For example, the medication Opill contains the synthetic hormone norgestrel, which has some distinct chemical differences despite producing a similar physiological effect.

== Available formulations ==
Progestogens share the common feature of being able to bind to the body's progesterone receptors and enact a physiological effect similar to naturally occurring progesterone. Still, there are differences between progestogens, and various organizational systems exist to categorize the progestogen hormones used in oral contraception medications.

By Generation - based on when it became available for use, each synthetic hormone can be grouped into 1 of 4 generations of medications. A medication's generation is not necessarily a reflection of safety or efficacy.

By Additional Receptor Activity - each medication may act upon other receptors such as androgen receptors, estrogen receptors, glucocorticoid receptors, and mineralocorticoid receptors. Additional interactions may be positive, increasing activity at a given receptor, or negative, decreasing activity at a given receptor. The overall profile of these additional actions for each medication can be used to describe and contrast progestogens.

Progestogen-only pill formulations
Generic formulation	Generation	Brand names	Additional receptor activity
Desogestrel (75 μg)	3rd	Cerazette; Cerelle	Gonadotropin (−); Estrogen (−); Androgen (+)
Drospirenone (4 mg)	4th	Slynd	Gonadotropin (−); Estrogen (−); Androgen (−); Mineralocorticoid (−)
Norethisterone (350 μg)	1st	Micronor; Nor-QD; Noriday	Gonadotropin (−); Estrogen (-/+); Pro-androgen (+); Coagulation (+)
Norgestrel (0.075 mg)	2nd	Opill	
Etynodiol diacetate (500 μg)	1st	Femulen	
Levonorgestrel (30 μg)	2nd	28 mini; Microval; Norgeston	Gonadotropin (−); Estrogen (−); Androgen (+)
Lynestrenol (500 μg)	1st	Exluton; Mini-kare	Gonadotropin (−); Estrogen (-/+); Androgen (+)
Norethindrone or norethisterone (300 μg)	1st	Camila; Mini-Pe; Errin; Heather; Jolivette; Micronor; Nor-QD; Nora-BE; Lyza; Sharobel; Deblitane	Gonadotropin (−); Estrogen (-/+); Androgen (+); Coagulation (+)
Norgestrel (75 μg) or levonorgestrel (37.5 μg)	2nd	Minicon; Neogest; Ovrette; Opill	Gonadotropin (−); Estrogen (−); Androgen (+)
Chlormadinone acetate (0.5 mg)	1st	Belara; Lutéran; Prostal	
Quingestanol acetate (0.3 mg)	—N/a	Demovis; Pilomin	

In the United States, progestogen-only pills are available in 350-μg norethisterone, 4-mg drospirenone, and 0.075-mg norgestrel formulations. Norgestrel is FDA-approved for over-the-counter availability. Norethindrone and drospirenone are available by prescription.

== Medical uses ==
Progestogen-only pills are one management option for the suppression of menstruation to avoid pregnancy.

With "perfect use," the efficacy of progestogen-only pills in avoiding unintended pregnancy is greater than 99%, meaning that less than 1 out of every 100 patients will experience undesired pregnancy within the first year of use. "Perfect use" means that an individual uses their contraceptive pill at the same time every day without missing a scheduled dose.

Assuming "typical use," the theoretical efficacy of progestogen-only pills in avoiding undesired pregnancy falls to around 91-93%, meaning that approximately 7 to 9 out of every 100 patients will experience an unintended pregnancy within the first year of use. "Typical use" means that an individual uses their contraceptive pill at inconsistent times day to day and/or misses scheduled doses. The study reporting the "typical use" failure rate failed to differentiate COCPs and POPs as distinct medications and instead studied them as a combined group, decreasing the validity of this finding. The results were published before the widespread use of progestogen-only pills other than norethindrone and may not be applicable to formulations that have since been developed. Reported efficacy varies between types of progestogen-only pills. For example, norgestrel has a reported failure rate of 2%, and drosperinone has a reported failure rate of 1.8%.

Some progestogen-only formulations, such as those containing norethindrone, were thought to have a shorter duration of effect than COCPs. As a result, current guidelines recommend no more than 27 hours between doses to ensure effectiveness, creating a 3-hour window of variability. However, a more recent meta-analysis suggested that there is actually a significantly longer half-life for many of the now available progestogen-only pill formulations. For example, norgestrel and drosperinone, in particular, appear to have a longer window of efficacy. More variation in dose timing may still effectively prevent pregnancy. Although the 3-hour window is still widely respected, some researchers have expressed their belief that an update to these guidelines may be beneficial.

=== Mechanism of action ===
Depending on the specific progestogen and its corresponding dose, the contraceptive effect of progestogen-only pills is enacted through combinations of the following mechanisms:

- Thickening the cervical mucus. This reduces sperm viability, sperm penetration, and decreases the likelihood of fertilization.
- Inhibition of ovulation through an action on the hypothalamic-pituitary-gonadal axis. For a low-dose formulation, this may occur inconsistently in ~50% of cycles. Intermediate-dose formulations, such as the progestogen-only pill Cerazette (desogestrel), much more consistently inhibit ovulation in 97–99% of cycles.
- Alteration of the endometrial lining of the uterus through modification of the structure of endometrial glands and their corresponding secretary patterns, as well as causing the endometrial lining to thin out (atrophy). Overall, the endometrium becomes less suitable for implantation of a fertilized egg and the likelihood of a viable pregnancy decreases.
- Reduction of fallopian tube motility leading to a slowing of the transport of eggs and sperm through the reproductive tract. The process of fertilization, as well as implantation, are both time-sensitive events. Disruption of the normal movement of these reproductive cells plays a role in preventing a viable pregnancy, although the magnitude of this role is likely less significant than previously mentioned mechanisms of action.

=== Breastfeeding ===
Patients who have recently given birth may benefit from contraception, as experiencing another pregnancy within six months of delivery is associated with poor outcomes for the second pregnancy. Lactational amenorrhea, although a common and effective method of preventing unwanted pregnancy following childbirth, may not be attainable for mothers who elect for or require supplemental or total child feeding with formula. Combined oral contraceptives are not typically recommended until six months following delivery. Progestogen-only pills, however, can be a viable contraceptive option for patients immediately following delivery, regardless of breastfeeding habits.

=== Comparison to combined oral contraceptives ===
Patients who choose COCPs versus progestogen-only pills may differ in other important ways, as progesterone-only pills are often preferentially prescribed to subfertile groups, such as recently postpartum women or older women. Progestogen-only pills may also be prescribed for individuals who do not wish to use estrogen-containing methods due to medical contraindications, intolerable side effects, or personal preference. Examples of contraindications to estrogen-containing methods of contraception include relatively common conditions such as hypertension, migraine headaches with aura, or a history of pulmonary embolism, or deep vein thrombosis. On the other hand, progestogen-only pills are safe for use by all these groups. The progestogen-only pill is also recommended for people who have recently given birth and desire a pill for contraception, given the risk of blood clots for both postpartum patients and people using estrogen-containing methods of contraception.

=== Abnormal uterine bleeding ===
Given their ability to impact the menstrual cycle and stabilize the endometrial lining of the uterus, progestogen-only pills are also used to treat various patterns of abnormal uterine bleeding.

Patients with unexplained, abnormal uterine bleeding should be evaluated by a medical professional. The initial assessment typically focuses on ensuring the patient is medically stable and not in any immediate danger from the underlying cause or associated blood loss. Understanding the underlying cause of bleeding is an important part of determining the best next step for treatment in each patient's circumstance. The PALM-COEIN classification system categorizes well-known causes of abnormal uterine bleeding in reproductive-age patients. Generally, treatment focuses on controlling the current episode of bleeding and reducing further blood loss in future menstrual cycles or acute episodes.

The decision to use POPs to treat abnormal uterine bleeding should be made in consultation with a medical professional who can offer guidance on the appropriateness of this treatment option. Depending on the underlying cause of bleeding, medical management with progestogen-only pills, combined oral contraceptives, or tranexamic acid may be appropriate. One study found that 76% of patients who took oral medroxyprogesterone acetate (20 mg) for treatment of bleeding unrelated to pregnancy saw resolution of their bleeding. The median time to resolution was 3 days from beginning therapy.

=== Adenomyosis ===
Patients with adenomyosis (abnormal growth of endometrial tissue in the wall of the uterus) may suffer heavy or painful menstrual periods. Through their ability to cause amenorrhea, progestogen-only pills can help reduce the symptoms associated with this condition. Levonorgestrel-impregnated intrauterine devices (IUDs) may be more effective than progestogen-only pills and reducing associated bleeding (maintaining healthy hemoglobin levels), uterine volume, and pain, although both methods have shown a beneficial impact. That being said, there is currently no definitive treatment guideline, and management can be tailored based to the patient's medical history, preferences, and response to treatment.

=== Endometriosis ===
Patients experiencing mild to moderate pelvic pain from endometriosis may be given non-steroidal anti-inflammatory drugs (NSAIDs) as well as hormonal contraceptives (COCPs or POPs) to help manage their symptoms. For a long time, combined oral contraceptives have been used as the first-line hormonal contraceptive (vs. progestogen-only pills) for the treatment of endometriosis. However, progestogen-only pills, including dienogest, medroxyprogesterone acetate, norethisterone, and cyproterone, are also effective in treating symptoms (e.g., pain, excess uterine bleeding), reducing associated lesions, and improving patient quality of life. Recognizing that some patients cannot receive combined oral contraceptives due to a contraindication to the estrogen component, these findings suggest that POPs can be an alternative therapy capable of producing adequate symptom relief. POPs are typically not given to patients experiencing severe symptoms.

=== Decreased likelihood of malignancy ===
Daily progesterone use decreases the risk of endometrial cancer, whereas it is unclear whether POPs provide protection against ovarian cancer to the extent that COCPs do.

== Side effects ==
=== Genitourinary ===
- Irregular menstrual bleeding and spotting in individuals taking progestogen-only pills, especially in the first months after starting. This side effect may be bothersome but is not dangerous, and most users report improved bleeding patterns with longer usage.
- May cause mastalgia (breast tenderness, pain)
- Available data on the average impact of POPs on mood are limited and conflicting, and do not show a clear link between POP usage and mental health changes. However, some patients may experience mood swings, including feelings of anxiety and depression.
- Follicular ovarian cysts are more common in POP users than in those not using hormones. The follicular changes tend to regress over time, and no intervention other than reassurance is required in asymptomatic individuals.

=== Breast cancer risk ===
Epidemiological evidence on POPs and breast cancer risk is based on much smaller populations than that for COCPs of users and so is less conclusive. In the largest (1996) reanalysis of previous studies of hormonal contraceptives and breast cancer risk, less than 1% were POP users. Current or recent POP users had a slightly increased relative risk (RR 1.17) of breast cancer diagnosis that just missed being statistically significant. The relative risk was similar to that found for current or recent COCP users (RR 1.16), and, as with COCPs, the increased relative risk decreased over time after stopping, vanished after 10 years, and was consistent with being due to earlier diagnosis or promoting the growth of a preexisting cancer.

The most recent (1999) IARC evaluation of progestogen-only hormonal contraceptives reviewed the 1996 reanalysis as well as 4 newer case-control studies of POP users. They concluded that: "Overall, there was no evidence of an increased risk of breast cancer".

Recent anxieties about the contribution of progestogens to the increased risk of breast cancer associated with HRT in postmenopausal women such as found in the WHI trials have not spread to progestogen-only contraceptive use in premenopausal women.

=== Depression ===
There is a growing body of research investigating the links between hormonal contraception, such as the progestogen-only pill, and potential adverse effects on women's psychological health. A large Danish study of one million women (followed-up from January 2000 to December 2013) reported that the use of hormonal contraception, particularly amongst adolescents, was associated with a statistically significant increased risk of subsequent depression. Women on the progestogen-only pill, in particular, were 34% more likely to later take anti-depressants or be given a diagnosis of depression, in comparison with those not on hormonal contraception. In 2018, a nationwide cohort study in Sweden amongst women aged 12–30 (n=815,662) found an association, particularly amongst adolescents aged 12–19, between hormonal contraception and subsequent use of psychotropic drugs. Still, the results of these studies are inconclusive because they are observational and cannot establish causality. Additionally, the studies do not account for the possibility of confounding factors, such as preexisting health conditions, which could influence the results.

=== Weight gain ===
There is some evidence that progestogen-only contraceptives may lead to weight gain (on average less than 2 kg in the first year) compared to women not using any hormonal contraception.

== History ==
The first POP to be introduced contained 0.5 mg chlormadinone acetate and was marketed in Mexico and France in 1968. However, it was withdrawn in 1970 due to safety concerns raised by long-term animal studies. Subsequently, levonorgestrel 30 μg (brand name Microval) was marketed in Germany in 1971. It was followed by a number of other POPs in the early 1970s, including etynodiol diacetate, lynestrenol, norethisterone, norgestrel, and quingestanol acetate. Desogestrel 75 μg (brand name Cerzette) was marketed in Europe in 2002 and was the most recent POP to be introduced. It differs from earlier POPs in that it is able to inhibit ovulation in 97% of cycles.

In July 2023, the USA Food and Drug Administration (FDA) approved the first over-the-counter (OTC) POP birth control pill to be sold without a prescription in the United States. The pill, marketed under the brand name Opill, contains once daily 0.075 mg oral norgestrel.

== See also ==
- Progestogen-only injectable contraceptive
- Oral contraceptive formulations
