= Frank B. Colton =

American chemist

Frank Benjamin Colton (March 3, 1923 – November 25, 2003), American chemist who first synthesized noretynodrel, the progestin used in Enovid, the first oral contraceptive, at G. D. Searle & Company in Skokie, Illinois in 1952.

== Biography ==
Frank B. Colton was born in Poland and immigrated to the United States in 1934. He earned his B.S. and M.S. degrees in chemistry from Northwestern University in 1945 and 1946 and his Ph.D. from the University of Chicago in 1950. He was a research fellow at the Mayo Foundation from 1949 to 1951 working with Nobel Laureate Edward C. Kendall to develop an improved synthesis of cortisone.

In 1951 he joined Searle as a senior research chemist. In 1952 Colton synthesized the progestin noretynodrel (an isomer of norethisterone), which combined with the estrogen mestranol as Enovid was approved by the U.S. Food and Drug Administration (FDA) in 1956 for menstrual disorders and in 1960 as the first oral contraceptive. In 1953 he synthesized norethandrolone, which as Nilevar was approved in 1956 as the first oral anabolic steroid. In 1954 Colton and Paul D. Klimstra synthesized the progestin etynodiol diacetate, which combined with the estrogen mestranol as Ovulen was approved in 1965 as Searle's second oral contraceptive, and combined with the estrogen ethinylestradiol was approved in 1970 as Demulen. Colton retired from Searle in 1986 as research adviser. In 1988 he was inducted into the National Inventors Hall of Fame.
