= ATCvet code QG52 =

Veterinary medical products classification subgroup

ATCvet code QG52 Products for teats and udder is a therapeutic subgroup of the Anatomical Therapeutic Chemical Classification System for veterinary medicinal products, a system of alphanumeric codes developed by the World Health Organization (WHO) for the classification of drugs and other medical products for veterinary use. Subgroup QG52 is part of the anatomical group QG Genito-urinary system and sex hormones.

National versions of the ATC classification may include additional codes not present in this list, which follows the WHO version.

== QG52A Disinfectants ==
Empty group

== QG52B Teat canal devices ==
Empty group

== QG52C Emollients ==
Empty group

== QG52X Various products for teats and udder ==
Empty group
