= C18H15FN4O =

The molecular formula C_{18}H_{15}FN_{4}O (molar mass: 322.343 g/mol) may refer to:

- WJ0679
- Finrozole
