= Norgestrel =

Progestin medication used for birth control

- Top, levonorgestrel (CAS 797-63-7 ); Bottom: dextronorgestrel (CAS 797-64-8 ).

Clinical data
- Trade names: Opill, others
- Other names: dl-Norgestrel; DL-Norgestrel; (±)-Norgestrel; WY-3707; SH-70850; SH-850; FH 122-A; rac-13-Ethyl-17α-ethynyl-19-nortestosterone; rac-13-Ethyl-17α-ethynylestr-4-en-17β-ol-3-one
- AHFS/Drugs.com: Micromedex Detailed Consumer Information
- MedlinePlus: a602008
- License data: US DailyMed: Norgestrel
- Routes of administration: By mouth
- Drug class: Progestin
- ATC code: G03AA06 (WHO) G03FA10 (WHO) G03FB01 (WHO) (only combinations with estrogens)

Legal status
- Legal status: US: OTC

Identifiers
- IUPAC name: (8R,9S,10R,13S,14S)-13-ethyl-17-ethynyl-17-hydroxy-1,2,6,7,8,9,10,11,12,14,15,16-dodecahydrocyclopenta[a]phenanthren-3-one
- CAS Number: 6533-00-2
- PubChem CID: 16051930
- DrugBank: DB09389
- ChemSpider: 10481953
- UNII: 3J8Q1747Z2
- KEGG: D00954
- ChEBI: CHEBI:7630
- ChEMBL: ChEMBL2107797
- CompTox Dashboard (EPA): DTXSID3047477
- ECHA InfoCard: 100.026.758

Chemical and physical data
- Formula: C_{21}H_{28}O_{2}
- Molar mass: 312.453 g·mol^{−1}
- 3D model (JSmol): Interactive image
- SMILES: O=C\1CC[C@H]4C(=C/1)/CC[C@@H]3[C@@H]4CC[C@@]2(CC)[C@H]3CCC2(O)C#C
- InChI: InChI=1S/C21H28O2/c1-3-20-11-9-17-16-8-6-15(22)13-14(16)5-7-18(17)19(20)10-12-21(20,23)4-2/h2,13,16-19,23H,3,5-12H2,1H3/t16-,17+,18+,19-,20-,21?/m0/s1; Key:WWYNJERNGUHSAO-CULCCENASA-N

Norgestrel, sold under the brand name Opill among others, is a progestin which is used in birth control pills. It is often combined with the estrogen ethinylestradiol, marketed as Ovral. It is also used in menopausal hormone therapy. It is taken by mouth.

Side effects of norgestrel include menstrual irregularities, headaches, nausea, and breast tenderness. The most common side effects of the norgestrel include irregular bleeding, headaches, dizziness, nausea, increased appetite, abdominal pain, cramps, or bloating. Norgestrel is a progestin, or a synthetic progestogen, and hence is an agonist of the progesterone receptor, the biological target of progestogens like progesterone. It has weak androgenic activity and no other important hormonal activity.

Norgestrel was patented in 1961 and came into medical use, specifically in birth control pills, in 1966. It was subsequently introduced for use in menopausal hormone therapy as well. Norgestrel is sometimes referred to as a "second-generation" progestin. It is marketed widely throughout the world. Norgestrel is available as a generic medication. In 2022, the version with ethinylestradiol was the 264th most commonly prescribed medication in the United States, with more than 1 million prescriptions. In July 2023, the US Food and Drug Administration (FDA) approved norgestrel for over-the-counter sale.

== Medical uses ==
Norgestrel is used in combination with ethinylestradiol or quinestrol in combined birth control pills, alone in progestogen-only birth control pills, and in combination with estradiol or conjugated estrogens in menopausal hormone therapy.

== Pharmacology ==
=== Pharmacodynamics ===
Norgestrel is a progestogen, or an agonist of the progesterone receptor. The biological activity of norgestrel lies in the levo enantiomer, levonorgestrel, whereas the dextro isomer is inactive. As such, norgestrel is identical in its hormonal activity to levonorgestrel except that it is half as potent by weight. Levonorgestrel, and by extension norgestrel, have some androgenic activity, but no estrogenic, antimineralocorticoid, or glucocorticoid activity.

Relative affinities (%) of levonorgestrel and metabolites
| Compound | PR | AR | ER | GR | MR | SHBG | CBG |
|---|---|---|---|---|---|---|---|
| Levonorgestrel | 150–162 | 34^{a}, 45 | 0 | 1–8 | 17–75 | 50 | 0 |
| 5α-Dihydrolevonorgestrel | 50 | 38^{a} | 0 | ? | ? | ? | ? |
| 3α,5α-Tetrahydrolevonorgestrel | ? | ? | 0.4 | ? | ? | ? | ? |
| 3β,5α-Tetrahydrolevonorgestrel | ? | ? | 2.4 | ? | ? | ? | ? |
Notes: Values are percentages (%). Reference ligands (100%) were promegestone for the PR, metribolone (^{a} = mibolerone) for the AR, E2 for the ER, DEXA for the GR, aldosterone for the MR, DHT for SHBG, and cortisol for CBG. Sources: See template.

The ovulation-inhibiting dose of norgestrel appears to be greater than 75 μg/day, as ovulation occurred in 50 to 75% of cycles with this dosage of norgestrel in studies. The ovulation-inhibiting dosage of levonorgestrel, which is twice as potent as norgestrel, is approximately 50 to 60 μg/day. One review lists the ovulation-inhibiting dose of norgestrel as 100 μg/day. The endometrial transformation dose of norgestrel is listed as 12 mg per cycle and the menstrual delay test dose of norgestrel is listed as 0.5 to 2 mg/day.

=== Pharmacokinetics ===
The pharmacokinetics of norgestrel have been reviewed.

== Chemistry ==
Norgestrel, also known as rac-13-ethyl-17α-ethynyl-19-nortestosterone or as rac-13-ethyl-17α-ethynylestr-4-en-17β-ol-3-one, is a synthetic estrane steroid and a derivative of testosterone. It is a racemic mixture of stereoisomers dextronorgestrel (the C13α isomer; l-norgestrel, L-norgestrel, or (+)-norgestrel) and levonorgestrel (the C13β isomer; d-norgestrel, D-norgestrel, or (–)-norgestrel), the former of which is inactive (making norgestrel exactly half as potent as levonorgestrel). Norgestrel is more specifically a derivative of norethisterone (17α-ethynyl-19-nortestosterone) and is a member of the gonane (18-methylestrane) subgroup of the 19-nortestosterone family of progestins.

=== Synthesis ===
Chemical syntheses of norgestrel have been published.

The chemical synthesis was first proposed by Smith & Hughes: Commercial: NB: Although the synthesis has involved the formation of no fewer than 6 chiral centers, only two of the possible 64 possible isomers are formed.

The halogenation of 3-(3-methoxyphenyl)propan-1-ol [7252-82-6] (1) with phosphorus tribromide gave 1-(3-bromopropyl)-3-methoxybenzene [6943-97-1] (2). Treatment with ethynylsodium led to 5-m-methoxyphenylpent-1-yne [1424-70-0] (3). (Ex 1) Mannich reaction with formalin and diethylamine led to 1-Diethylamino-6-m-methoxyphenylhex-2-yne, PC21485597 (4). (Ex 8) An oxymercuration reaction with mercury(II) sulfate in aqueous sulfuric acid gives a mixture of 1-(diethylamino)-6-(3-methoxyphenyl)hexan-3-one [3706-69-2] (5) and 6-m-methoxyphenylhex-1-en-3-one, PC10798238 (6). (Ex 17) Treatment with 2-Ethyl-1,3-cyclopentanedione [823-36-9] (7) in the presence of pyridine base causes a Michael reaction to occur to give 2-Ethyl-2-[6-(m-methoxyphenyl)-3-oxohexyl]-1,3-cyclopentanedione, PC21485569 (8). (Ex 43) The cyclodehydration step was achieved by refluxing with a catalytic amount of TsOH in a DS-trap to give [848-07-7] (9). (Ex 68) Catalytic hydrogenation over Raney nickel gives (10). (Ex 83) Reduction with sodium borohydride leads to PC12598343 (11). (Ex 108) Birch reduction with lithium metal in and liquid ammonia in 1-methoxypropan-2-ol gives (12). (Ex 116) Oppenauer oxidation of the alcohol gives the ketone (13). (Ex 121) Reaction with ethynyllithium led to (14). (Ex 170) Hydrolysis in mineral acid completed the synthesis of norgestrel (15).

Alternative route: Improved ethynylation procedure: German: Dane's method:

== History ==
Norgestrel was first introduced, as a birth control pill in combination with ethinylestradiol, under the brand name Eugynon in Germany in 1966. It was subsequently marketed as a combined birth control pill with ethinylestradiol in the United States under the brand name Ovral in 1968, and was marketed in many other countries as well.

The contraceptive efficacy of norgestrel was established in the U.S. with the original approval for prescription use in 1973.

In July 2023, the FDA approved norgestrel for over-the-counter sale. The FDA granted the approval to Laboratoire HRA Pharma which was acquired by Perrigo Company plc.

== Society and culture ==
=== Generic names ===
Norgestrel is the generic name of the drug and its international nonproprietary name, United States Adopted Name, United States Pharmacopeia, British Approved Name, Dénomination Commune Française, Denominazione Comune Italiana, and Japanese Accepted Name. It is also known as dl-norgestrel, DL-norgestrel, or (±)-norgestrel.

=== Brand names ===
Norgestrel is marketed under a variety of brand names including Cyclacur, Cryselle, Cyclo-Progynova, Duoluton, Elinest, Eugynon, Microgynon, Lo/Ovral, Low-Ogestrel, Logynon, Microlut, Minicon, Nordette, Neogest, Opill, Ogestrel, Ovral, Ovran, Ovranette, Ovrette, Planovar, Prempak, Progyluton, and Trinordiol among others.

== See also ==
- Norgestimate
- Gestodene
- Etonogestrel
- Norboletone
- Norgestrienone
- Desogestrel
