= Lynestrenol =

Androgen and anabolic steroid

Clinical data
- Trade names: Exluton, Ministat, others
- Other names: Linestrenol; Lynenol; NSC-37725; 17α-Ethynylestr-4-en-17β-ol; 19-Nor-17α-pregn-4-en-20-yn-17-ol
- AHFS/Drugs.com: International Drug Names
- Routes of administration: By mouth
- Drug class: Progestogen; Progestin
- ATC code: G03AC02 (WHO) G03DC03 (WHO); G03AA03 (WHO) G03AB02 (WHO) G03FA07 (WHO) G03FB02 (WHO) (combinations with estrogens)

Identifiers
- IUPAC name: (8R,9S,10R,13S,14S,17R)-17-ethynyl-13-methyl-2,3,6,7,8,9,10,11,12,14,15,16-dodecahydro-1H-cyclopenta[a]phenanthren-17-ol
- CAS Number: 52-76-6
- PubChem CID: 5857
- ChemSpider: 5648
- UNII: N2Z8ALG4U5
- KEGG: D01580
- CompTox Dashboard (EPA): DTXSID4021478
- ECHA InfoCard: 100.000.139

Chemical and physical data
- Formula: C_{20}H_{28}O
- Molar mass: 284.443 g·mol^{−1}
- 3D model (JSmol): Interactive image
- SMILES: C#C[C@]2(O)CC[C@H]1[C@H]4[C@H](CC[C@@]12C)[C@@H]3\C(=C/CCC3)CC4
- InChI: InChI=1S/C20H28O/c1-3-20(21)13-11-18-17-9-8-14-6-4-5-7-15(14)16(17)10-12-19(18,20)2/h1,6,15-18,21H,4-5,7-13H2,2H3/t15-,16+,17+,18-,19-,20-/m0/s1; Key:YNVGQYHLRCDXFQ-XGXHKTLJSA-N

Lynestrenol, sold under the brand names Exluton and Ministat among others, is a progestin medication which is used in birth control pills and in the treatment of gynecological disorders. The medication is available both alone and in combination with an estrogen. It is taken by mouth.

Lynestrenol is a progestin, or a synthetic progestogen, and hence is an agonist of the progesterone receptor, the biological target of progestogens like progesterone. It has weak androgenic and estrogenic activity and no other important hormonal activity. The medication is a prodrug of norethisterone in the body, with etynodiol occurring as an intermediate.

Lynestrenol was discovered in the late 1950s and was introduced for medical use in 1961. It has mostly been used in Europe and elsewhere in the world and was never marketed in the United States.

== Medical uses ==
Lynestrenol is used as a component of oral contraceptives in combination with an estrogen and is used in the treatment of gynecological disorders such as menstrual disorders.

== Pharmacology ==
Norethisterone (3-ketolynestrenol), the active metabolite of lynestrenol.

Lynestrenol itself does not bind to the progesterone receptor and is inactive as a progestogen. It is a prodrug, and upon oral administration, is rapidly and almost completely converted into norethisterone, a potent progestogen, in the liver during first-pass metabolism. No other metabolites besides norethisterone are formed from lynestrenol. As such, its pharmacological activity is essentially identical to that of norethisterone. The conversion of lynestrenol into norethisterone is catalyzed by CYP2C9 (28.0%), CYP2C19 (49.8%), and CYP3A4 (20.4%), while other cytochrome P450 enzymes are each responsible for no more than 1.0% of the total conversion. It appears that lynestrenol first undergoes hydroxylation of the C3 position, forming etynodiol as an intermediate, followed by oxygenation of the hydroxyl group to form norethisterone.

The peak blood levels are reached within 2 to 4 hours after oral administration, 97% of the administered dose being bound to plasma proteins. Lynestrenol and its metabolites are predominantly excreted in urine, less in feces, active metabolite norethisterone elimination half-life being 16 or 17 hours.

The pharmacokinetics of lynestrenol have been reviewed.

Relative affinities (%) of norethisterone, metabolites, and prodrugs
Compound	Type^{a}	PR	AR	ER	GR	MR	SHBG	CBG
Norethisterone	–	67–75	15	0	0–1	0–3	16	0
5α-Dihydronorethisterone	Metabolite	25	27	0	0	?	?	?
3α,5α-Tetrahydronorethisterone	Metabolite	1	0	0–1	0	?	?	?
3α,5β-Tetrahydronorethisterone	Metabolite	?	0	0	?	?	?	?
3β,5α-Tetrahydronorethisterone	Metabolite	1	0	0–8	0	?	?	?
Ethinylestradiol	Metabolite	15–25	1–3	112	1–3	0	0.18	0
Norethisterone acetate	Prodrug	20	5	1	0	0	?	?
Norethisterone enanthate	Prodrug	?	?	?	?	?	?	?
Noretynodrel	Prodrug	6	0	2	0	0	0	0
Etynodiol	Prodrug	1	0	11–18	0	?	?	?
Etynodiol diacetate	Prodrug	1	0	0	0	0	?	?
Lynestrenol	Prodrug	1	1	3	0	0	?	?
Notes: Values are percentages (%). Reference ligands (100%) were promegestone for the PR, metribolone for the AR, estradiol for the ER, dexamethasone for the GR, aldosterone for the MR, dihydrotestosterone for SHBG, and cortisol for CBG. Footnotes: ^{a} = Active or inactive metabolite, prodrug, or neither of norethisterone. Sources: See template.

== Chemistry ==
Lynestrenol, also known as 17α-ethynyl-3-desoxy-19-nortestosterone or as 17α-ethynylestr-4-en-17β-ol, is a synthetic estrane steroid and a derivative of 19-nortestosterone. It differs from norethisterone (17α-ethynyl-19-nortestosterone) and etynodiol (17α-ethynyl-3-deketo-3β-hydroxy-19-nortestosterone) only by the lack of a ketone group and hydroxyl group at the C3 position, respectively.

=== Synthesis ===
Chemical syntheses of lynestrenol have been published.

In another approach to analogues, nortestosterone (1) is first converted to the dithioketal (2) by treatment with dithioglycol in the presence of boron trifluoride. (The mild conditions of this reaction compared to those usually employed in preparing the oxygen ketals probably accounts for the double bond remaining at 4,5). Treatment of this derivative with sodium in liquid ammonia affords the 3-desoxy analog (3). Oxidation by means of Jones reagent followed by ethynylation of the 17-ketone leads to the orally active progestin (6).

Lynestrenol synthesis:

== History ==
Lynestrenol was developed by the Dutch pharmaceutical company Organon in the late 1950s and was introduced for medical use in 1961. It received a Dutch patent for lynestrenol in 1957, and lynestrenol subsequently became a component of Lyndiol, the first Dutch contraceptive pill, in 1962. Around this time, pre- and post-marketing clinical trials of lynestrenol were conducted, and in 1965, a study consisting of 200 Dutch women was published. Lynestrenol was approved, in the United Kingdom, in combination with mestranol in 1963 and in combination with ethinylestradiol in 1969.

== Society and culture ==
=== Generic names ===
Lynestrenol is the generic name of the drug and its INN, USAN, BAN, and JAN, while lynestrénol is its DCF and linestrenolo is its DCIT. Lynoestrenol was formerly the BAN of the drug, but it was eventually changed to lynestrenol.

=== Brand names ===
Lynestrenol has been marketed alone as Exluton, Exlutona, and Orgametril, in combination with mestranol as Anacyclin, Lyndiol, Lyndiol 1, Lyndiol 2.5, Nonovul, and Noracycline, and in combination with ethinylestradiol as Anacyclin, Fysioquens, Minilyn, and Ministat, among other formulations and brand names.

=== Availability ===
Lynestrenol has been used mainly in Europe and is also marketed elsewhere throughout the world. The drug was never marketed in the United States.
