= Etynodiol diacetate =

Chemical compound

Clinical data
- Trade names: Ovulen, Demulen, others
- Other names: Ethynodiol diacetate; Norethindrol diacetate; 3β-Hydroxynorethisterone 3β,17β-diacetate; 17α-Ethynylestr-4-ene-3β,17β-diyl diacetate; CB-8080; SC-11800
- License data: US DailyMed: Ethynodiol
- Pregnancy category: Contraindicated
- Routes of administration: By mouth
- Drug class: Progestogen; Progestin; Progestogen ester
- ATC code: G03DC06 (WHO) G03AA01 (WHO) G03FA06 (WHO) (with an estrogen)

Legal status
- Legal status: AU: S4 (Prescription only); US: ℞-only; In general: ℞ (Prescription only)

Identifiers
- IUPAC name: [(3S,8R,9S,10R,13S,14S,17R)-17-acetyloxy-17-ethynyl-13-methyl-2,3,6,7,8,9,10,11,12,14,15,16-dodecahydro-1H-cyclopenta[a]phenanthren-3-yl] acetate
- CAS Number: 297-76-7; 8056-92-6
- PubChem CID: 9270
- IUPHAR/BPS: 7072
- DrugBank: DB00823
- ChemSpider: 8913
- UNII: 62H10A1236
- KEGG: D01294
- ChEBI: CHEBI:31580
- ChEMBL: ChEMBL1200624
- CompTox Dashboard (EPA): DTXSID4020614
- ECHA InfoCard: 100.005.496

Chemical and physical data
- Formula: C_{24}H_{32}O_{4}
- Molar mass: 384.516 g·mol^{−1}
- 3D model (JSmol): Interactive image
- SMILES: O=C(O[C@@H]4/C=C3\[C@@H]([C@H]2CC[C@]1([C@@H](CC[C@]1(C#C)OC(=O)C)[C@@H]2CC3)C)CC4)C
- InChI: InChI=1S/C24H32O4/c1-5-24(28-16(3)26)13-11-22-21-8-6-17-14-18(27-15(2)25)7-9-19(17)20(21)10-12-23(22,24)4/h1,14,18-22H,6-13H2,2-4H3/t18-,19-,20+,21+,22-,23-,24-/m0/s1; Key:ONKUMRGIYFNPJW-KIEAKMPYSA-N

Etynodiol diacetate, or ethynodiol diacetate, sold under the brand name Ovulen among others, is a progestin medication which is used in birth control pills. The medication is available only in combination with an estrogen. It is taken by mouth.

Etynodiol diacetate is a progestin, or a synthetic progestogen, and hence is an agonist of the progesterone receptor, the biological target of progestogens like progesterone. It has weak androgenic and estrogenic activity and no other important hormonal activity. The medication is a prodrug of norethisterone in the body, with etynodiol occurring as an intermediate.

Etynodiol, a related compound, was discovered in 1954, and etynodiol diacetate was introduced for medical use in 1965. The combination ethynodiol with mestranol (Ovulen) was approved for medical use in the United States in 1966. The combination ethinylestradiol with ethynodiol (Demulen) was approved for medical use in the United States in 1970.

In 2023, the combination with ethinylestradiol was the 376th most commonly prescribed medication in the United States, with more than 6,000 prescriptions.

== Medical uses ==
Etynodiol diacetate is used in combination with an estrogen such as ethinylestradiol or mestranol in combined oral contraceptives for women for the prevention of pregnancy.

== Pharmacology ==
Norethisterone (3-ketoetynodiol), the active metabolite of etynodiol diacetate.

Etynodiol diacetate is virtually inactive in terms of affinity for the progesterone and androgen receptors and acts as a rapidly converted prodrug of norethisterone, with etynodiol occurring as an intermediate. Upon oral administration and during first-pass metabolism in the liver, etynodiol diacetate is rapidly converted by esterases into etynodiol, which is followed by oxygenation of the C3 hydroxyl group to produce norethisterone. In addition to its progestogenic activity, etynodiol diacetate has weak androgenic activity, and, unlike most progestins but similarly to norethisterone and noretynodrel, also has some estrogenic activity.

The pharmacokinetics of etynodiol diacetate have been reviewed.

Relative affinities (%) of norethisterone, metabolites, and prodrugs
Compound	Type^{a}	PR	AR	ER	GR	MR	SHBG	CBG
Norethisterone	–	67–75	15	0	0–1	0–3	16	0
5α-Dihydronorethisterone	Metabolite	25	27	0	0	?	?	?
3α,5α-Tetrahydronorethisterone	Metabolite	1	0	0–1	0	?	?	?
3α,5β-Tetrahydronorethisterone	Metabolite	?	0	0	?	?	?	?
3β,5α-Tetrahydronorethisterone	Metabolite	1	0	0–8	0	?	?	?
Ethinylestradiol	Metabolite	15–25	1–3	112	1–3	0	0.18	0
Norethisterone acetate	Prodrug	20	5	1	0	0	?	?
Norethisterone enanthate	Prodrug	?	?	?	?	?	?	?
Noretynodrel	Prodrug	6	0	2	0	0	0	0
Etynodiol	Prodrug	1	0	11–18	0	?	?	?
Etynodiol diacetate	Prodrug	1	0	0	0	0	?	?
Lynestrenol	Prodrug	1	1	3	0	0	?	?
Notes: Values are percentages (%). Reference ligands (100%) were promegestone for the PR, metribolone for the AR, estradiol for the ER, dexamethasone for the GR, aldosterone for the MR, dihydrotestosterone for SHBG, and cortisol for CBG. Footnotes: ^{a} = Active or inactive metabolite, prodrug, or neither of norethisterone. Sources: See template.

== Chemistry ==
Etynodiol diacetate, also known as 3β-hydroxy-17α-ethynyl-19-nortestosterone 3β,17β-diaceate, 3β-hydroxynorethisterone 3β,17β-diacetate, or 17α-ethynylestr-4-ene-3β,17β-diol 3β,17β-diacetate, is a synthetic estrane steroid and a derivative of testosterone. It is specifically a derivative of 19-nortestosterone and 17α-ethynyltestosterone, or of norethisterone (17α-ethynyl-19-nortestosterone), in which the C3 ketone group has been dehydrogenated into a C3β hydroxyl group and acetate esters have been attached at the C3β and C17β positions. Etynodiol diacetate is the 3β,17β-diacetate ester of etynodiol (17α-ethynylestr-4-ene-3β,17β-diol).

=== Synthesis ===
Ethynodiol diacetate synthesis: F. B. Colton, U.S. patent 2,843,609 (1958 to Searle). Prepn of the 3-acetate, 17-acetate, and diacetate: P. D. Klimstra, U.S. patent 3,176,013 (1965 to Searle); see also:

Chemical syntheses of etynodiol diacetate have been published.

Reduction of norethisterone (1) affords the 3,17-diol. The 3β-hydroxy compound is the desired product; since reactions at C3 do not show nearly the stereoselectivity as those at C17 by virtue of the relative lack of stereo-directing proximate substituents, the formation of the desired isomer is engendered by use of a bulky reducing agent, lithium tri-tert-butoxyaluminum hydride. Acetylation of the 3β,17β-diol affords etynodiol diacetate (3).

== History ==
Etynodiol was first synthesized in 1954, via reduction of norethisterone, and etynodiol diacetate was introduced for medical use in 1965.

== Society and culture ==
=== Generic names ===
Etynodiol diacetate is the generic name of the drug (the INN of its free alcohol form is etynodiol), while ethynodiol diacetate is its USAN, BAN, and JAN. It is also known by its former developmental code names CB-8080 and SC-11800.

=== Brand names ===
Etynodiol diacetate is or has been marketed under brand names including Conova, Continuin, Demulen, Femulen, Kelnor, Lo-Malmorede, Luteonorm, Luto-Metrodiol, Malmorede, Metrodiol, Ovulen, Soluna, Zovia, and others.

=== Availability ===
Etynodiol diacetate is marketed in only a few countries, including the United States, Canada, Argentina, and Oman.
