= ATC code G03 =

ATC code G03 Sex hormones and modulators of the genital system is a therapeutic subgroup of the Anatomical Therapeutic Chemical Classification System, a system of alphanumeric codes developed by the World Health Organization (WHO) for the classification of drugs and other medical products. Subgroup G03 is part of the anatomical group G Genito-urinary system and sex hormones.

Codes for veterinary use (ATCvet codes) can be created by placing the letter Q in front of the human ATC code: for example, QG03. ATCvet codes without corresponding human ATC codes are cited with the leading Q in the following list.
National versions of the ATC classification may include additional codes not present in this list, which follows the WHO version.

== G03A Hormonal contraceptives for systemic use ==
=== G03AA Progestogens and estrogens, fixed combinations ===
G03AA01 Etynodiol and ethinylestradiol
G03AA02 Quingestanol and ethinylestradiol
G03AA03 Lynestrenol and ethinylestradiol
G03AA04 Megestrol and ethinylestradiol
G03AA05 Norethisterone and ethinylestradiol
G03AA06 Norgestrel and ethinylestradiol
G03AA07 Levonorgestrel and ethinylestradiol
G03AA08 Medroxyprogesterone and ethinylestradiol
G03AA09 Desogestrel and ethinylestradiol
G03AA10 Gestodene and ethinylestradiol
G03AA11 Norgestimate and ethinylestradiol
G03AA12 Drospirenone and ethinylestradiol
G03AA13 Norelgestromin and ethinylestradiol
G03AA14 Nomegestrol and estradiol
G03AA15 Chlormadinone and ethinylestradiol
G03AA16 Dienogest and ethinylestradiol
G03AA17 Medroxyprogesterone and estradiol
G03AA18 Drospirenone and estetrol

=== G03AB Progestogens and estrogens, sequential preparations ===
G03AB01 Megestrol and ethinylestradiol
G03AB02 Lynestrenol and ethinylestradiol
G03AB03 Levonorgestrel and ethinylestradiol
G03AB04 Norethisterone and ethinylestradiol
G03AB05 Desogestrel and ethinylestradiol
G03AB06 Gestodene and ethinylestradiol
G03AB07 Chlormadinone and ethinylestradiol
G03AB08 Dienogest and estradiol
G03AB09 Norgestimate and ethinylestradiol

=== G03AC Progestogens ===
G03AC01 Norethisterone
G03AC02 Lynestrenol
G03AC03 Levonorgestrel
G03AC04 Quingestanol
G03AC05 Megestrol
G03AC06 Medroxyprogesterone
G03AC07 Norgestrienone
G03AC08 Etonogestrel
G03AC09 Desogestrel
G03AC10 Drospirenone

=== G03AD Emergency contraceptives ===
G03AD01 Levonorgestrel
G03AD02 Ulipristal

== G03B Androgens ==
=== G03BA 3-oxoandrosten-(4) derivatives ===
G03BA01 Fluoxymesterone
G03BA02 Methyltestosterone
G03BA03 Testosterone

=== G03BB 5-androstanon-(3) derivatives ===
G03BB01 Mesterolone
G03BB02 Androstanolone

== G03C Estrogens ==
=== G03CA Natural and semisynthetic estrogens, plain ===
G03CA01 Ethinylestradiol
G03CA03 Estradiol
G03CA04 Estriol
G03CA06 Chlorotrianisene
G03CA07 Estrone
G03CA09 Promestriene
G03CA10 Estetrol
G03CA53 Estradiol, combinations
G03CA57 Conjugated estrogens

=== G03CB Synthetic estrogens, plain ===
G03CB01 Dienestrol
G03CB02 Diethylstilbestrol
G03CB03 Methallenestril
G03CB04 Moxestrol

=== G03CC Estrogens, combinations with other drugs ===
G03CC02 Dienestrol
G03CC03 Methallenestril
G03CC04 Estrone
G03CC05 Diethylstilbestrol
G03CC06 Estriol
G03CC07 Conjugated estrogens and bazedoxifene

=== G03CX Other estrogens ===
G03CX01 Tibolone

== G03D Progestogens ==
=== G03DA Pregnen-(4) derivatives ===
G03DA01 Gestonorone
G03DA02 Medroxyprogesterone
G03DA03 Hydroxyprogesterone
G03DA04 Progesterone
QG03DA90 Proligestone

=== G03DB Pregnadien derivatives ===
G03DB01 Dydrogesterone
G03DB02 Megestrol
G03DB03 Medrogestone
G03DB04 Nomegestrol
G03DB05 Demegestone
G03DB06 Chlormadinone
G03DB07 Promegestone
G03DB08 Dienogest

=== G03DC Estren derivatives ===
G03DC01 Allylestrenol
G03DC02 Norethisterone
G03DC03 Lynestrenol
G03DC04 Ethisterone
G03DC05 Tibolone
G03DC06 Etynodiol
G03DC31 Methylestrenolone (normethandrone)

=== QG03DX Other progestogens ===
QG03DX90 Altrenogest
QG03DX91 Delmadinone

== G03E Androgens and female sex hormones in combination ==
=== G03EA Androgens and estrogens ===
G03EA01 Methyltestosterone and estrogen
G03EA02 Testosterone and estrogen
G03EA03 Prasterone and estrogen

=== G03EK Androgens and female sex hormones in combination with other drugs ===
G03EK01 Methyltestosterone

== G03F Progestogens and estrogens in combination ==
=== G03FA Progestogens and estrogens, fixed combinations ===
G03FA01 Norethisterone and estrogen
G03FA02 Hydroxyprogesterone and estrogen
G03FA03 Ethisterone and estrogen
G03FA04 Progesterone and estrogen
G03FA05 Methylnortestosterone (normethandrone) and estrogen
G03FA06 Etynodiol and estrogen
G03FA07 Lynestrenol and estrogen
G03FA08 Megestrol and estrogen
G03FA09 Noretynodrel and estrogen
G03FA10 Norgestrel and estrogen
G03FA11 Levonorgestrel and estrogen
G03FA12 Medroxyprogesterone and estrogen
G03FA13 Norgestimate and estrogen
G03FA14 Dydrogesterone and estrogen
G03FA15 Dienogest and estrogen
G03FA16 Trimegestone and estrogen
G03FA17 Drospirenone and estrogen

=== G03FB Progestogens and estrogens, sequential preparations ===
G03FB01 Norgestrel and estrogen
G03FB02 Lynestrenol and estrogen
G03FB03 Chlormadinone and estrogen
G03FB04 Megestrol and estrogen
G03FB05 Norethisterone and estrogen
G03FB06 Medroxyprogesterone and estrogen
G03FB07 Medrogestone and estrogen
G03FB08 Dydrogesterone and estrogen
G03FB09 Levonorgestrel and estrogen
G03FB10 Desogestrel and estrogen
G03FB11 Trimegestone and estrogen
G03FB12 Nomegestrol and estrogen

== G03G Gonadotropins and other ovulation stimulants ==
=== G03GA Gonadotropins ===
G03GA01 Human chorionic gonadotropin
G03GA02 Human menopausal gonadotropin
G03GA03 Serum gonadotropin
G03GA04 Urofollitropin
G03GA05 Follitropin alfa
G03GA06 Follitropin beta
G03GA07 Lutropin alfa
G03GA08 Choriogonadotropin alfa
G03GA09 Corifollitropin alfa
G03GA10 Follitropin delta
G03GA30 Combinations
QG03GA90 Follicle stimulating hormone-pituitary
QG03GA99 Gonadotropins, combinations

=== G03GB Ovulation stimulants, synthetic ===
G03GB01 Cyclofenil
G03GB02 Clomifene
G03GB03 Epimestrol

== G03H Antiandrogens ==
=== G03HA Antiandrogens, plain ===
G03HA01 Cyproterone

=== G03HB Antiandrogens and estrogens ===
G03HB01 Cyproterone and estrogen

== G03X Other sex hormones and modulators of the genital system ==
=== G03XA Antigonadotropins and similar agents ===
G03XA01 Danazol
G03XA02 Gestrinone
QG03XA90 Anti-Pmsg
QG03XA91 Gonadotropin releasing factor analogue, conjugated

=== G03XB Progesterone receptor modulators ===
G03XB01 Mifepristone
G03XB02 Ulipristal
G03XB51 Mifepristone, combinations
QG03XB90 Aglepristone

=== G03XC Selective estrogen receptor modulators ===
G03XC01 Raloxifene
G03XC02 Bazedoxifene
G03XC03 Lasofoxifene
G03XC04 Ormeloxifene
G03XC05 Ospemifene

=== G03XX Other sex hormones and modulators of the genital system ===
G03XX01 Prasterone
QG03XX90 Finrozole
