= Finrozole =

Names
- Preferred IUPAC name 4-[(1R,2S)-3-(4-Fluorophenyl)-2-hydroxy-1-(1H-1,2,4-triazol-1-yl)propyl]benzonitrile

Identifiers
CAS Number	160146-17-8
3D model (JSmol)	Interactive image
ChEMBL	ChEMBL2218882
ChemSpider	5293483
ECHA InfoCard	100.219.051
PubChem CID	6918277
UNII	40028KHQ6B
CompTox Dashboard (EPA)	DTXSID90166806
- InChI: InChI=1S/C18H15FN4O/c19-16-7-3-13(4-8-16)9-17(24)18(23-12-21-11-22-23)15-5-1-14(10-20)2-6-15/h1-8,11-12,17-18,24H,9H2/t17-,18+/m0/s1 Key: SLJZVZKQYSKYNV-ZWKOTPCHSA-N
- SMILES: C1=CC(=CC=C1C[C@@H]([C@@H](C2=CC=C(C=C2)C#N)N3C=NC=N3)O)F

Pharmacology
ATCvet code	QG03XX90 (WHO)
Legal status	EU: Rx-only
- Except where otherwise noted, data are given for materials in their standard state (at 25 °C [77 °F], 100 kPa). Infobox references

Finrozole is an aromatase (CYP19A1) inhibitor.

Finrozole was authorized for veterinary use in the European Union in April 2025.

== Medical uses ==
Finrozole is indicated to shorten the pro-oestrus and oestrus period, reduce clinical signs of heat and reduce the risk of pregnancy.
