= Active metabolite =

Form of a substance after metabolism

An active metabolite, or pharmacologically active metabolite, is a biologically active metabolite of a xenobiotic substance, such as a drug or environmental chemical. Active metabolites may produce therapeutic effects, as well as harmful effects.

== Metabolites of drugs ==
An active metabolite results when a drug is metabolized by the body into a modified form which produces effects in the body. Usually these effects are similar to those of the parent drug but weaker, although they can still be significant (see e.g. 11-hydroxy-THC, morphine-6-glucuronide). Certain drugs such as codeine and tramadol have metabolites (morphine and O-desmethyltramadol respectively) that are stronger than the parent drug and in these cases the metabolite may be responsible for much of the therapeutic action of the parent drug. Sometimes, however, metabolites may produce toxic effects and patients must be monitored carefully to ensure they do not build up in the body. This is an issue with some well-known drugs, such as pethidine (meperidine) and dextropropoxyphene.

== Prodrugs ==
Sometimes drugs are formulated in an inactive form that is designed to break down inside the body to form the active drug. These are called prodrugs. The reasons for this type of formulation may be because the drug is more stable during manufacture and storage as the prodrug form, or because the prodrug is better absorbed by the body or has superior pharmacokinetics (e.g., lisdexamphetamine).
