= Transcortin =

Protein found in humans

SERPINA6
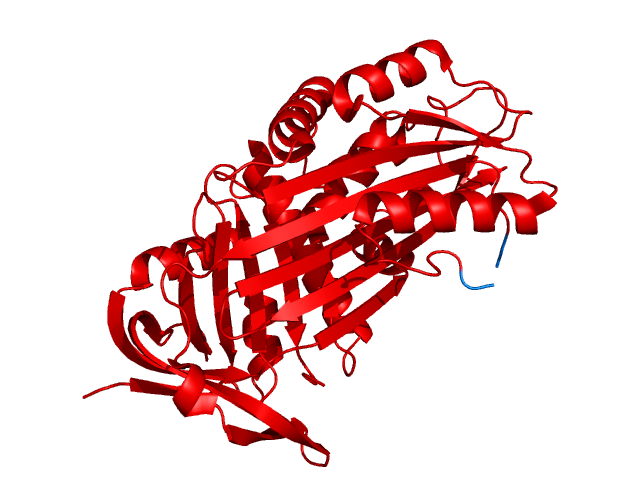

Identifiers
- Aliases: SERPINA6, CBG, serpin family A member 6
- External IDs: OMIM: 122500; MGI: 88278; GeneCards: SERPINA6
Available structures
PDB	Ortholog search: PDBe RCSB
PDB	List of PDB id codes 2VDX, 2VDY, 4BB2, 4C41, 4C49

Gene location (Human)
Chr.	Chromosome 14 (human)
Band	14q32.13	Start	94,304,248 bp
Band	14q32.13	End	94,323,389 bp

Gene location (Mouse)
Chr.	Chromosome 12 (mouse)
Band	12 E|12 52.98 cM	Start	103,612,889 bp
Band	12 E|12 52.98 cM	End	103,623,471 bp
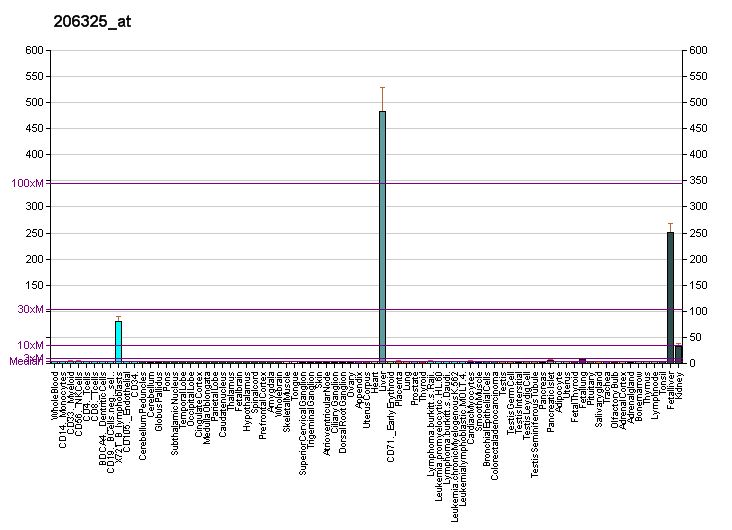
RNA expression pattern
Bgee	Human / Mouse (ortholog); Top expressed in: liver; right lobe of liver; gallbladder; islet of Langerhans; body of pancreas; right uterine tube; rectum; canal of the cervix; human kidney; mucosa of transverse colon / Top expressed in: fetal liver hematopoietic progenitor cell; human fetus; left lobe of liver; abdominal wall; gallbladder; embryo; perirhinal cortex; entorhinal cortex; CA3 field; choroid plexus of fourth ventricle; More reference expression data
BioGPS	More reference expression data
Gene ontology
Molecular function	steroid binding; serine-type endopeptidase inhibitor activity; lipid binding
Cellular component	extracellular region; extracellular exosome; extracellular space
Biological process	glucocorticoid metabolic process; negative regulation of endopeptidase activity; transport
Sources:Amigo / QuickGO
Orthologs
Databases	NCBI: entry; OMA: entry
Species	Human	Mouse
Entrez	866	12401
Ensembl	ENSG00000277405; ENSG00000170099	ENSMUSG00000060807
UniProt	P08185	Q06770
RefSeq (mRNA)	NM_001756	NM_007618
RefSeq (protein)	NP_001747	NP_031644
Location (UCSC)	Chr 14: 94.3 – 94.32 Mb	Chr 12: 103.61 – 103.62 Mb
PubMed search
- Wikidata
View/Edit Human	View/Edit Mouse

Transcortin, also known as corticosteroid-binding globulin (CBG) or serpin A6, is a protein produced in the liver in animals. In humans it is encoded by the SERPINA6 gene. It is an alpha-globulin.

== Function ==
This gene encodes an alpha-globulin protein with corticosteroid-binding properties. This is the major transport protein for glucocorticoids and progestins in the blood of most vertebrates. The gene localizes to a chromosomal region containing several closely related serine protease inhibitors (serpins).

== Binding ==
Transcortin binds several steroid hormones at high rates:

- Cortisol - Approximately 90% of the cortisol in circulation is bound to transcortin. (The rest is bound to serum albumin.) Cortisol is thought to be biologically active only when it is not bound to transcortin.
- Cortisone
- Deoxycorticosterone (DOC)
- Corticosterone - About 78% of serum corticosterone is bound to transcortin.
- Aldosterone - Approximately 17% of serum aldosterone is bound to transcortin, while another 47% is bound to serum albumin. The remaining 36% is free.
- Progesterone - Approximately 18% of serum progesterone is bound to transcortin, while another 80% of it is bound to serum albumin. The remaining 2% is free.
- 17α-Hydroxyprogesterone

In addition, approximately 4% of serum testosterone is bound to transcortin. A similarly small fraction of serum estradiol is bound to transcortin as well.

== Synthesis ==
Transcortin is produced by the liver and is increased by estrogens.

== Clinical significance ==
Mutations in this gene are rare. Only four mutations have been described, often in association with fatigue and chronic pain. The mechanism for these symptoms is not known. This condition must be distinguished from secondary hypocortisolism. Exogenous hydrocortisone does not appear to improve the fatigue.

Hepatic synthesis of corticosteroid-binding globulin more than doubles in pregnancy; that is, bound plasma cortisol in term pregnancy is approximately 2 to 3 times that of nonpregnant women.

== See also ==
- Serpin
- Circaseptan, 7-day biological cycle
