= Mineralocorticoid receptor =

Nuclear receptor that mediates the effects of the mineralocorticoid hormone Aldosterone

NR3C2
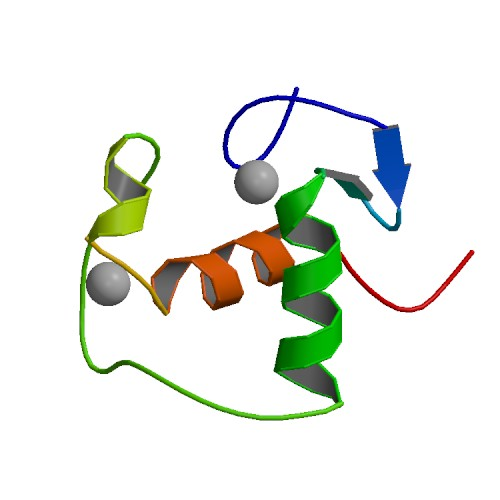

Identifiers
- Aliases: NR3C2, MCR, MLR, MR, NR3C2VIT, nuclear receptor subfamily 3 group C member 2
- External IDs: OMIM: 600983; MGI: 99459; GeneCards: NR3C2
Available structures
PDB	Ortholog search: PDBe RCSB
PDB	List of PDB id codes 1Y9R, 1YA3, 2A3I, 2AA2, 2AA5, 2AA6, 2AA7, 2AAX, 2AB2, 2ABI, 2OAX, 3VHU, 3VHV, 3WFF, 3WFG, 4PF3, 4TNT, 4UDB, 4UDA, 5HCV

Gene location (Human)
Chr.	Chromosome 4 (human)
Band	4q31.23	Start	148,078,762 bp
Band	4q31.23	End	148,444,698 bp

Gene location (Mouse)
Chr.	Chromosome 8 (mouse)
Band	8 C1|8 36.34 cM	Start	77,626,070 bp
Band	8 C1|8 36.34 cM	End	77,971,641 bp
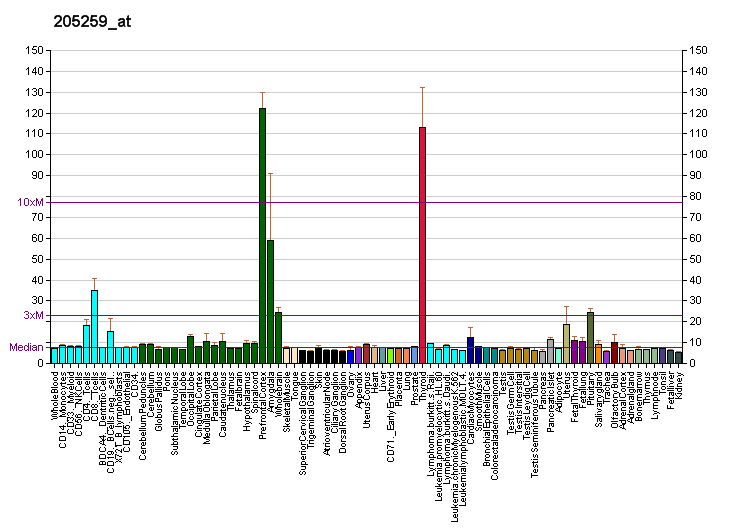
RNA expression pattern
Bgee	Human / Mouse (ortholog); Top expressed in: endothelial cell; mucosa of colon; mucosa of sigmoid colon; rectum; middle temporal gyrus; Epithelium of choroid plexus; mucosa of ileum; Brodmann area 23; Achilles tendon; jejunal mucosa / Top expressed in: subdivision of hippocampus; Region I of hippocampus proper; hippocampus proper; left colon; lateral septal nucleus; dentate gyrus; facial motor nucleus; ciliary body; subiculum; dentate gyrus of hippocampal formation granule cell; More reference expression data
BioGPS	More reference expression data
Gene ontology
Molecular function	sequence-specific DNA binding; DNA binding; DNA-binding transcription factor activity; zinc ion binding; metal ion binding; steroid hormone receptor activity; steroid binding; protein binding; lipid binding; DNA-binding transcription factor activity, RNA polymerase II-specific
Cellular component	cytoplasm; endoplasmic reticulum membrane; membrane; receptor complex; endoplasmic reticulum; nucleus; nucleoplasm; cytosol
Biological process	regulation of transcription, DNA-templated; transcription, DNA-templated; transcription initiation from RNA polymerase II promoter; signal transduction; steroid hormone mediated signaling pathway; regulation of transcription by RNA polymerase II; positive regulation of NIK/NF-kappaB signaling
Sources:Amigo / QuickGO
Orthologs
Databases	NCBI: entry; OMA: entry
Species	Human	Mouse
Entrez	4306	110784
Ensembl	ENSG00000151623	ENSMUSG00000031618
UniProt	P08235	Q8VII8
RefSeq (mRNA)	NM_000901; NM_001166104; NM_001354819	NM_001083906
RefSeq (protein)	NP_000892; NP_001159576; NP_001341748	n/a
Location (UCSC)	Chr 4: 148.08 – 148.44 Mb	Chr 8: 77.63 – 77.97 Mb
PubMed search
- Wikidata
View/Edit Human	View/Edit Mouse

The mineralocorticoid receptor (or MR, MLR, MCR), also known as the aldosterone receptor or nuclear receptor subfamily 3, group C, member 2 (NR3C2) is a protein that in humans is encoded by the NR3C2 gene that is located on chromosome 4q31.1-31.2.

MR is a receptor with equal affinity for mineralocorticoids and glucocorticoids. It belongs to the nuclear receptor family where the ligand diffuses into cells, interacts with the receptor and results in a signal transduction affecting specific gene expression in the nucleus. The selective response of some tissues and organs to mineralocorticoids over glucocorticoids occurs because mineralocorticoid-responsive cells express Corticosteroid 11-beta-dehydrogenase isozyme 2, an enzyme which selectively inactivates glucocorticoids more readily than mineralocorticoids.

== Function ==
MR is expressed in many tissues, such as the kidney, colon, heart, central nervous system (hippocampus), brown adipose tissue and sweat glands. In epithelial tissues, its activation leads to the expression of proteins regulating ionic and water transports (mainly the epithelial sodium channel or ENaC, Na+/K+ pump, serum and glucocorticoid induced kinase or SGK1) resulting in the reabsorption of sodium, and as a consequence an increase in extracellular volume, increase in blood pressure, and an excretion of potassium to maintain a normal salt concentration in the body.

The receptor is activated by mineralocorticoids such as aldosterone and its precursor deoxycorticosterone as well as glucocorticoids like cortisol. In intact animals, the mineralocorticoid receptor is "protected" from glucocorticoids by co-localization of an enzyme, corticosteroid 11-beta-dehydrogenase isozyme 2 (a.k.a. 11β-hydroxysteroid dehydrogenase 2; 11β-HSD2), that converts cortisol to inactive cortisone.

Activation of the mineralocorticoid receptor, upon the binding of its ligand aldosterone, results in its translocation to the cell nucleus, homodimerization and binding to hormone response elements present in the promoter of some genes. This results in the complex recruitment of the transcriptional machinery and the transcription into mRNA of the DNA sequence of the activated genes.

An activating mutation in the NR3C2 gene (S810L) results in constitutive activity of the mineralocorticoid receptor, leading to severe early-onset hypertension that is exacerbated by pregnancy. In a family known to harbor the S810L mutation, 3 individuals carrying the mutation died of chronic heart failure before age 50. Additional studies have shown that this activated version of MR can positively respond to ligands that are traditionally antagonists, such as endogenous hormones like progesterone, and the diuretic drugs spironolactone and eplerenone.

== Ligands ==
Aldosterone, 11-deoxycorticosterone, and cortisol are endogenous agonists of the MR. Fludrocortisone is a synthetic agonist of the MR which is used clinically. Progesterone is a potent endogenous antagonist of the MR. Synthetic antagonists of the MR include the steroidal compounds spironolactone, canrenone, eplerenone, and drospirenone and the nonsteroidal compounds apararenone, esaxerenone, and finerenone.

== Interactions ==
Mineralocorticoid receptor has been shown to interact with:

- Glucocorticoid receptor and
- TRIM24.

== See also ==
- Aldosterone
- Glucocorticoid
- Mineralocorticoid
