= Contraceptive implant =

Implantable medical device used for birth control

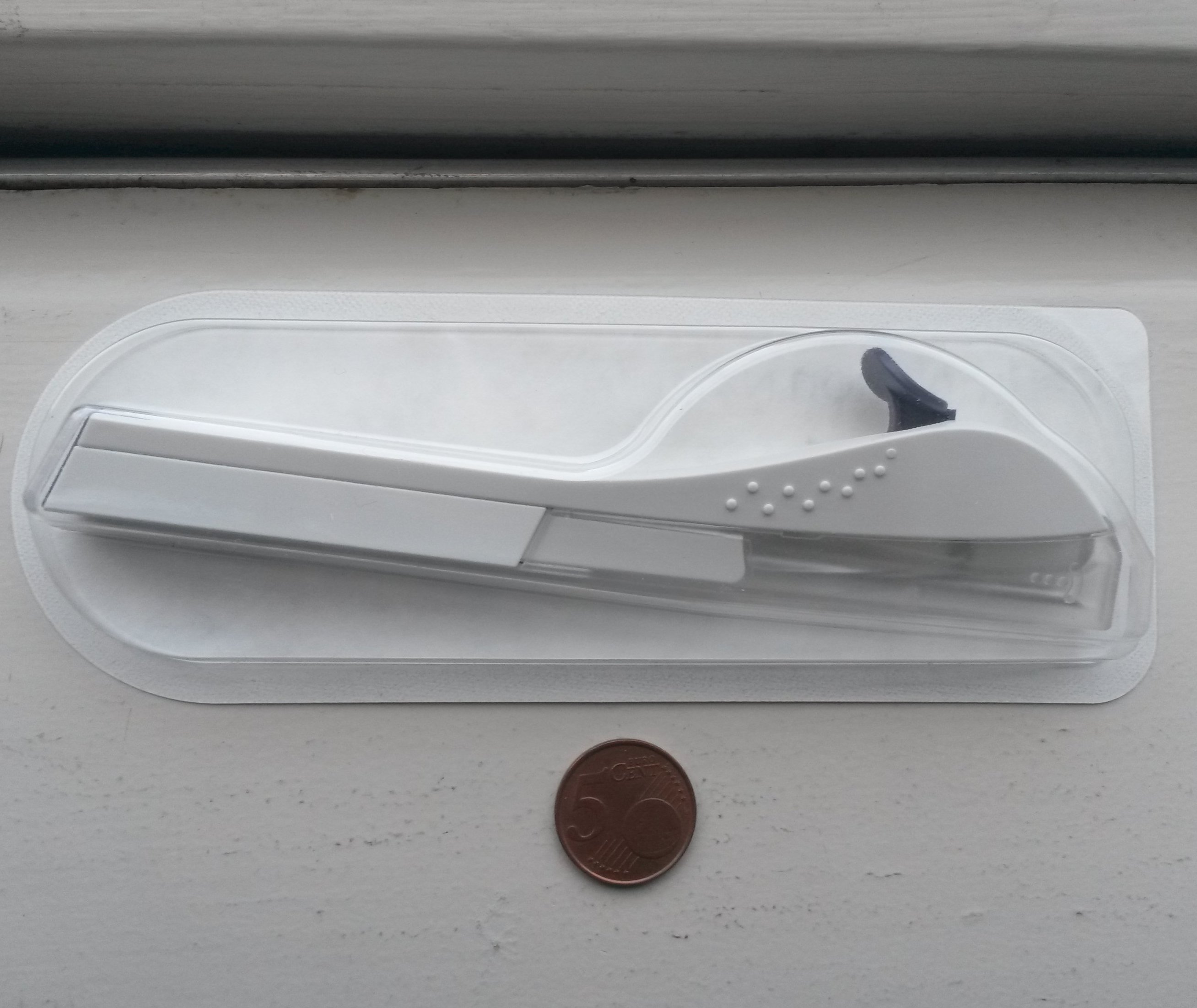
- Container/applicator for Nexplanon, an example of an etonogestrel-based contraceptive implant

Background
- Type: Long-acting reversible contraception
- First use: ?
- Trade names: Implanon/Nexplanon, Jadelle

Failure rates (first year)
- Perfect use: 0.05%
- Typical use: 0.05%

Usage
- Duration effect: 3–5 years
- User reminders: None

Advantages and disadvantages
- STI protection: No protection

A contraceptive implant is an implantable medical device used for the purpose of birth control. The implant may depend on the timed release of hormones to hinder ovulation or sperm development, the ability of copper to act as a natural spermicide within the uterus, or it may work using a non-hormonal, physical blocking mechanism. As with other contraceptives, a contraceptive implant is designed to prevent pregnancy, but it does not protect against sexually transmitted infections.

== Women ==
Insertion of a contraceptive implant into a woman's arm

Removal of a contraceptive implant from a woman's arm

=== Implant ===
The contraceptive implant is hormone-based and highly effective, approved in more than 60 countries and used by millions of women around the world. The typical implant is a small flexible tube measuring about 40 mm (1.6 in) in length. It is most commonly inserted subdermally in the inner portion of the upper, non-dominant arm by a trained and certified health care provider. After insertion, it prevents pregnancy by releasing progestin which inhibits ovulation. The two most common versions are the single-rod etonogestrel implant and the two-rod levonorgestrel implant. Brands include: Norplant, Jadelle (Norplant II), Implanon, Nexplanon, Sino-implant (II), Zarin, Femplant and Trust.

==== Benefits ====
Some brands of the contraceptive implant, including Nexplanon, are over 99% effective. The benefits of the contraceptive implant are dependent on the active ingredients. Depending on the type of implant, benefits of the implant may include fewer, lighter periods, improved symptoms of premenstrual syndrome, long-lasting up to three to five years, and the convenience of not needing to remember to use it every day. The implant is also useful for women who cannot use contraception that contains oestrogen. The implant can also be removed at any time and natural fertility will return very quickly.

==== Side effects ====
When the implant is first inserted, it is common to have some bruising, tenderness or swelling around the implant. In some cases, irregular bleeding or amenorrhea occur. Although irregularity in bleeding can be troublesome for some women, this also allows for use in treatment of dysmenorrhea, menorrhagia, and endometriosis. Less common symptoms include change in appetite, depression, moodiness, hormonal imbalance, sore breasts, weight gain, dizziness, pregnancy symptoms, and lethargy. Although rare, there is also a risk of complications occurring during insertion or removal of the implant. In rare cases, the area of skin where the implant has been inserted can become infected, which can require antibiotics.

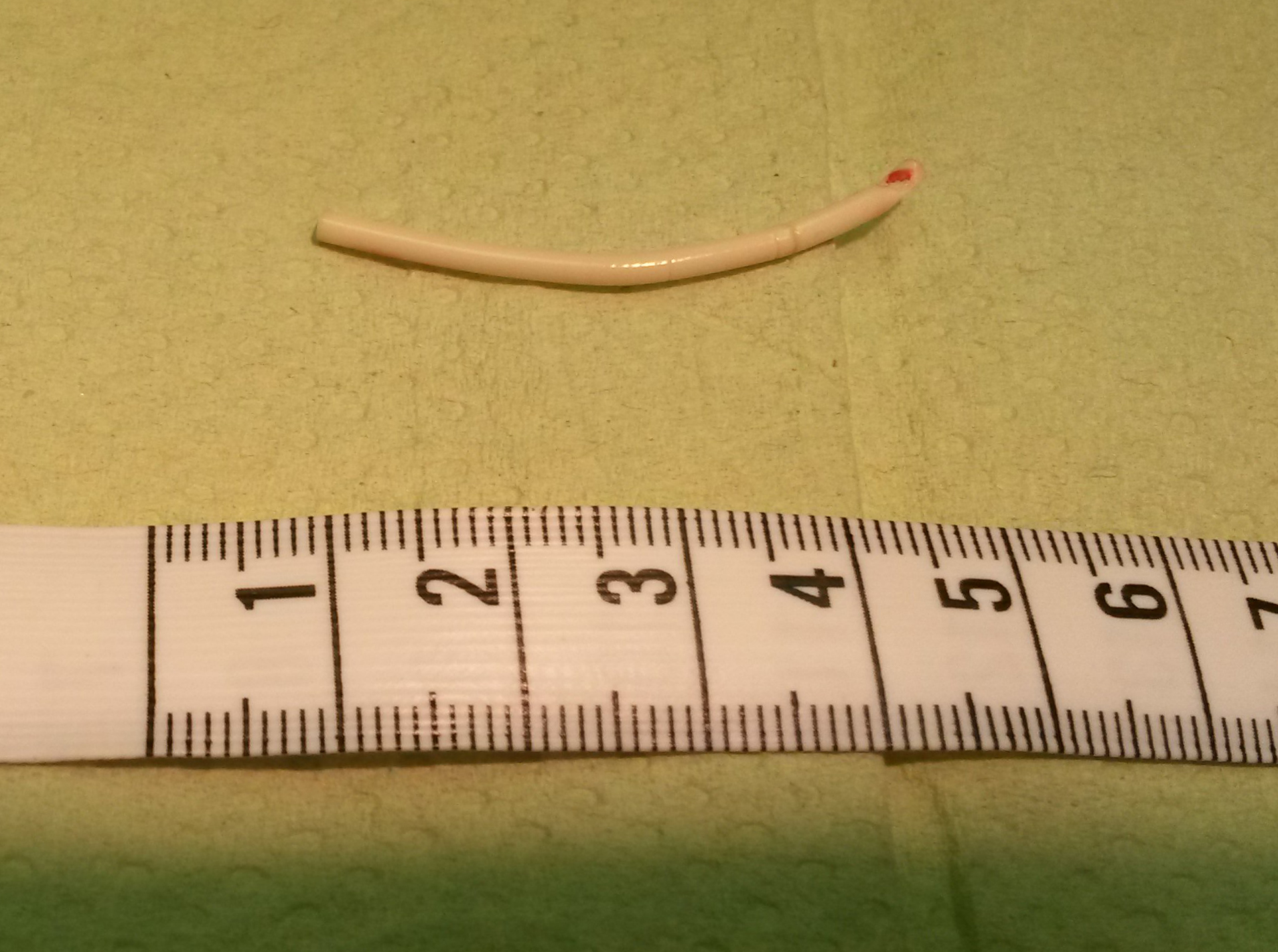
The Implanon is a 4–5 cm long arm implant.

Most commonly reported from the levonorgestrel-releasing intrauterine system LNG-IUG contraceptive; breast tenderness, headaches, swelling, and skin irritation. contraceptive also corresponds with earlier waking, frequent mood swings, impaired concentration, and strain. Irregular vaginal uterus lining shedding is a common pattern with Norplant users; if this occurs it will be seen during the first 60 days of use but it can subside or disappear over time. The Implanon also has these negative side effects causing a considerable amount of vaginal bleeding irregularities, and amenorrhea in about 30–40% of its users during the following 90 days of starting use.

==== Postpartum use ====
With regard to helping women space their pregnancies appropriately, there is some debate about the most effective time to insert contraceptive implants after pregnancy. It is likely that implant insertion immediately following childbirth increases the number of postpartum implant users compared to when insertion occurs four to six weeks after childbirth (because some patients do not return for their six-week checkup). However, there may be little or no difference between immediate and delayed insertion in terms of continued use of implants at six months or in terms of women's satisfaction, even though some studies found higher continuation rates at six months if the implant was inserted immediately after childbirth. Progestin containing implants (specifically etonogestrel) are safe for immediate insertion in both postpartum individuals and those post-abortion.

=== Intrauterine device ===
An intrauterine device (IUD) is a small contraceptive device, often T-shaped, which is implanted into the uterus. They can be hormonal or non-hormonal, and are long-acting, reversible. As of 2011, IUDs are the most widely used form of reversible contraception worldwide. Among types of birth control they, along with birth control implants, result in the greatest satisfaction among users. IUDs also tend to be one of the most cost-effective methods of contraception for women. Cons of intrauterine devices, similarly to implants, is the need for a trained healthcare professional for both insertion and removal.

Brands include: Paragard, Kyleena, Liletta, Mirena, and Skyla.

==== Hormonal IUD ====
Hormonal IUDs contain the hormone levonorgestrel which is a progestin. Most commonly, products are inserted for 5 years, allowing them to release a low dose of hormones over that time frame. The mechanism of action of both hormonal and non-hormonal IUDs is similar, plus the additional benefit of progestin causing a thickening of the cervical mucus.

The levonorgestrel IUD is highly efficacious and has a failure rate of only 0.2% in the first year of use. An additional benefit of hormonal IUDs is decreased blood loss, which 20-30% of patients will experience amenorrhea. Within 1–3 months of removing the intrauterine device, however, patients should experience a return to their normal menstrual cycle. The most common side effect of levonorgestrel containing IUDs is spotting during the first 3 months.

Use in patients immediately postpartum can be discussed but the greater potential for expulsion and perforation must be carefully considered.

==== Non-hormonal IUD ====
Non-hormonal IUDs, also known as copper IUDs, are a hormone-free option of contraception available and work by two main mechanisms of action. They are thought to slow the rate at which sperm reaches the fallopian tubes or decreases fertilization of the egg. An increase of copper ions, along with other cells and enzymes, is what affects functioning of the sperm and the prevention of pregnancy.

Although they do have a higher risk of pregnancy compared to hormonal IUDs, failure rates with the copper IUD are still only approximately 0.8%. They also provide protection from anywhere between 2.5 and 10 years depending on the brand and manufacturer. Potential adverse effects of copper IUDs include heavier menses and increased menstrual cramping.

Copper IUDs have the ability to be inserted anywhere from 10 minutes to 48 hours postpartum. The disadvantage of this immediate insertion is the associated higher risk of expulsion or uterine perforation, however, the benefits greatly outweigh any potential risk. They also are safe to use in lactation.

An additional benefit of copper IUDs is their use in emergency contraception. Not only are they able to be used as a form of emergency contraception but a Cochrane review noted that they are the most effective method of emergency contraception as well. When inserted within 7 days of unprotected intercourse, they are able to reduce the risk of pregnancy by 99% and provide the added benefit of ongoing contraception in the patient too.

== Men ==
Several barriers exist to expanding research into implantable and other contraceptive methods for men, including vague regulatory guidelines, long device development timelines, men's attitudes towards convenience, and a significant lack of funding. Several implantable devices have been attempted, both hormonal and non-hormonal.

=== Research ===
In 2001, Dutch pharmaceutical company Organon announced clinical trials of its implantable etonogestrel-based male contraceptive would begin in Europe and the U.S., anticipating a marketable product as early as 2005. Despite promising results, research development stopped, with outside speculation that lack of marketability was a factor. Organon representative Monique Mols stated in 2007 that "[d]espite 20 years of research, the development of a [hormonal] method acceptable to a wide population of men is unlikely". Schering/Bayer had been working on a similar annual implant with quarterly injections but cancelled the research in 2006/2007, declaring that men would most likely view it as "not as convenient as a woman taking a pill once a day."

In 2005, a collaboratory project led by the Population Council, the University of California, Los Angeles, and the Medical Research Council began researching a matchstick-sized implant that contains MENT (7α-methyl-19-nortestosterone or trestolone), a "synthetic steroid that resembles testosterone." Clinical trials were set to begin in 2011 or 2012, and the project was ongoing as of 2016, with hopes of gaining approval as the first reversible male contraceptive.

In 2006, Shepherd Medical Company received FDA approval for a clinical trial of its non-hormonal implant called an intra vas device (IVD), which consists of two plugs that block sperm flow in the vas deferens. Working on the success of its pilot study and solid results from its clinical trials, the company announced it would expand its trials to three U.S. cities later that year. Questions remained about how reversible the procedure would be in the long-term; however, it was expected to be more reversible than a vasectomy. In 2008, the company disbanded due to the economic crisis but has stated it would restart its research with proper funding.

In January 2016, news broke of a non-hormonal, implantable valve—the Bimek SLV. It included a switch that attaches to the vas deferens, allowing the owner to stop and resume the flow of sperm on demand. A clinical trial of 25 participants was announced to further test the efficacy of the device.

== Other animals ==
Implantable contraception is also an option for animals, particularly for animal managers at zoos and other captive animal facilities who require reversible contraception methods for managing population growth in limited captive habitat. The Association of Zoos and Aquariums' (AZA) Reproductive Management Center (formerly known as the AZA Wildlife Contraception Center) at the Saint Louis Zoo in St. Louis, Missouri, has played a major role in researching and disseminating contraception information, via its Contraception Database. It houses over 30,000 records for hundreds of species. One of the most popular contraceptive methods used by zoos (as well as in domestic animals) is the melengestrol acetate (MGA) implant, a progestin-based hormonal contraceptive developed in the mid-1970s. Other progestin-based implants that have been placed in animals include Norplant, Jadelle, and Implanon. Androgen-based implants that use agonist (stimulating) gonadotropin-releasing hormone (GnRH) and, to a lesser degree, IUDs have also seen use in several domestic and exotic species. Whatever the implant, some care must be taken to minimize the risk of implant migration or loss.
