= Copper IUD =

Birth control and emergency contraceptive device

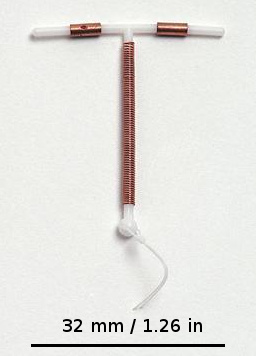
- Photo of a common IUD (Paragard T 380A)

Background
- Type: Intrauterine
- First use: 1970s
- Trade names: copper-T, ParaGard, others
- AHFS/Drugs.com: FDA Professional Drug Information

Failure rates (first year)
- Perfect use: 0.6%
- Typical use: 0.8%

Usage
- Duration effect: 5–12+ years
- Reversibility: rapid
- User reminders: ?
- Clinic review: Annually

Advantages and disadvantages
- STI protection: No
- Periods: May be heavier and more painful
- Benefits: Unnecessary to take any daily action. Emergency contraception if inserted within 5 days
- Risks: <1 in 100: pelvic infection within 20 days of insertion 1.1 in 1000: uterine perforation

A copper intrauterine device (IUD), also known as an intrauterine coil, copper coil, or non-hormonal IUD, is a form of long-acting reversible contraception and one of the most effective forms of birth control available. It can also be used for emergency contraception within five days of unprotected sex. The device is placed in the uterus and lasts up to twelve years, depending on the amount of copper present in the device. It may be used for contraception regardless of age or previous pregnancy, and may be placed immediately after a vaginal delivery, cesarean delivery, or surgical abortion. Following its removal, fertility quickly returns.

Common side effects include heavy menstrual periods and increased menstrual cramps (dysmenorrhea). Rarely, the device may come out or perforate the uterine wall.

The copper IUD was initially developed in Germany in the early 1900s, but came into widespread medical use in the 1970s. It is on the World Health Organization's List of Essential Medicines.

== Medical uses ==
Copper IUDs are a form of long-acting reversible contraception and are one of the most effective forms of birth control available. The type of frame and amount of copper in the device can affect the effectiveness of different copper IUD models.

The copper IUD is effective as contraception as soon as it is inserted, and loses efficacy when removed or if it becomes malpositioned. The effectiveness of the copper IUD (failure rate of 0.8%) is comparable to tubal sterilization (failure rate of 0.5%) for the first year. The failure rates for different models vary between 0.1 and 2.2% after one year of use. The T-shaped models with a surface area of 380 mm^{2} of copper have the lowest failure rates. The TCu 380A (Paragard) has a one-year failure rate of 0.8% and a cumulative 12-year failure rate of 2.2%. Over 12 years of use, the models with less surface area of copper have higher failure rates. The TCu 220A has a 12-year failure rate of 5.8%. The frameless GyneFix has a failure rate of less than 1% per year. A 2008 review of the available T-shaped copper IUDs recommended that the TCu 380A and the TCu 280S be used as the first choice for copper IUDs because those two models have the lowest failure rates and the longest lifespans. Worldwide, older IUD models with lower effectiveness rates are no longer produced.

Though only approved by regulatory agencies for a maximum of 12 years, some devices may be effective with continuous use for up to 20 years.

Because it does not contain hormones, the copper IUD does not disrupt the timing of an individual's menstrual cycle, nor does it prevent ovulation.

=== Emergency contraception ===
It was first discovered in 1976 that the copper IUD could be used as a form of emergency contraception (EC). The copper IUD is the most effective form of emergency contraception, more effective than oral hormonal emergency contraception, including mifepristone, ulipristal acetate, and levonorgestrel. Efficacy is not affected by user weight. The pregnancy rate among those using the copper IUD for emergency contraception is 0.09%. It can be used for emergency contraception up to five days after unprotected sex, and does not decrease in effectiveness during the five days. An additional advantage of using the copper IUD for emergency contraception is that it can then be used as a form of birth control for 10–12 years after insertion.

=== Removal and return to fertility ===
Removal of the copper IUD should be performed by a qualified medical practitioner. Fertility has been shown to return to previous levels quickly after removal of the device.

== Side effects and complications ==
=== Complications ===
The most common complications related to the copper IUD are expulsion, perforation, and infection. Infertility after discontinuation and difficulty breastfeeding during use are not associated with the copper IUD.

Expulsion rates can range from 2.2% to 11.4% of users from the first year to the 10th year. The TCu 380A may have lower rates of expulsion than other models, and the frameless copper IUD has a similar rate of expulsion to models with frames. Expulsion is more likely with immediate or early postpartum or post-abortal placement. In the postpartum period, expulsion is less likely when the device is placed less than ten minutes after the placenta is delivered, or when inserted after a cesarean delivery. Unusual vaginal discharge, cramping or pain, spotting between periods, postcoital (after sex) spotting, pain during intercourse (dyspareunia), or the absence or lengthening of the strings can be signs of a possible expulsion. As with intentional removal, the device is immediately ineffective after expulsion. If an IUD with copper is inserted after an expulsion has occurred, the risk of re-expulsion has been estimated in one study to be approximately one third of cases after one year. Magnetic resonance imaging (MRI) may cause dislocation of a copper IUD, and it is therefore recommended to check the location of the IUD both before and after MRI.

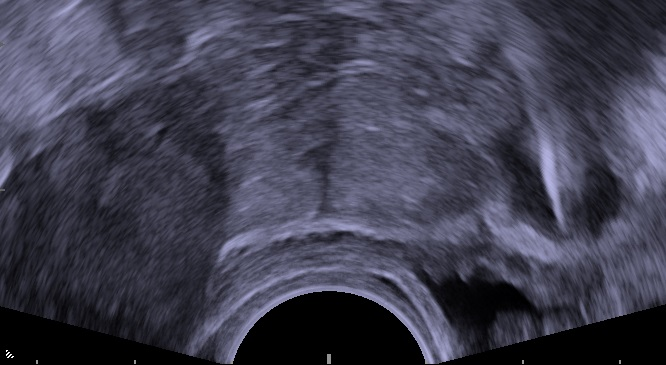
Transvaginal ultrasonography showing a perforated copper IUD as a hyperechoic (rendered as bright) line at right, 3 centimeters away from the uterus at left. The IUD is surrounded by a hypoechoic (dark) foreign-body granuloma.

Perforation of the device through the uterine wall typically occurs at the time of placement, though it may occur spontaneously during the period of use. Estimates of the rate of perforation vary from 1.1 per 1000 to 1 per 3000 copper IUD insertions. Perforation may be slightly more common in people using the copper IUD while breastfeeding.

Due to its inflammatory mechanism of action, a copper IUD that has completely perforated typically requires surgical removal due to the formation of dense adhesions around the device. A device embedded in the uterine wall may be removed hysteroscopically or surgically.

The insertion of a copper IUD poses a transient risk of pelvic inflammatory disease (PID) for 21 days, though this is almost always in the setting of undiagnosed gonorrhea or chlamydia infection at the time of insertion. This occurs in less than 1 in 100 insertions. Beyond this time frame there is no increased risk of PID associated with copper IUD use. Postpartum insertion of a copper IUD is not associated with increased risk of infection, provided that the delivery was not complicated by an infection such as chorioamnionitis.

During removal, the device may break, which can cause uterine wall perforation and potentially lead to more severe complications, including infertility. In rare cases, the IUD may be unintentionally expelled from the uterus, for example due to physical trauma such as a car accident.

=== Side effects ===
The most common side effects reported with use of the copper IUD are increased menstrual bleeding and menstrual cramps, both of which may remit after 3–6 months of use. Less frequently, intermenstrual bleeding may occur, especially in the first 3–6 months of use. The increase in menstrual blood volume varies in different studies but is reported to be as low as 20% and as high as 55%; however, there is no evidence for a concomitant change in ferritin, hemoglobin, or hematocrit.

Menorrhagia (increased menstrual bleeding) and dysmenorrhea (painful menstrual bleeding) are typically treated with NSAID medications including naproxen, ibuprofen, and mefenamic acid.

=== Contraceptive failure ===
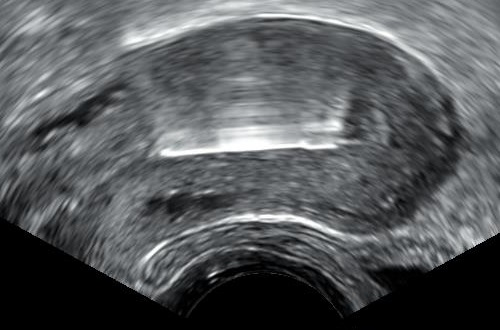
Transvaginal ultrasonography visualizing an IUD with copper in the optimal location within the uterus.

The absolute risk of ectopic pregnancy with copper IUD use is lower than with no contraception because it works primarily by preventing conception. The copper inhibits sperm migration and viability, which prevents fertilisation. However, when pregnancy does occur with a copper IUD in place, a higher percentage of those pregnancies are ectopic, from 3% to 6%, a two to sixfold increase. This corresponds to an absolute rate of ectopic pregnancy in copper IUD users of 0.2–0.4 per 1000 person-years, compared to 3 per 1000 person-years in the population using no contraception.

If a pregnancy continues with the IUD in place, there is an increased risk of complications including preterm delivery, chorioamnionitis, and spontaneous abortion. If the IUD is removed, these risks are lower, especially the risks of bleeding and miscarriage; the rate of miscarriage approaches that of the general population depending on study population.

Overall failure rates with the copper IUD are low, and are mainly dependent on the surface area of copper in the device. After 12 years of continuous use, the TCu 380A device has a cumulative pregnancy rate of 1.7%. The TCu 380A is more effective than the MLCu375, MLCu350, TCu220, and TCu200. The TCu 380S is more effective than the TCu 380A. The frameless device has similar failure rates to conventional devices.

=== Contraindications ===
The copper IUD is considered safe and effective during lactation and in those who have never been pregnant. In the World Health Organization (WHO) Medical Eligibility Criteria for Contraceptive Use, category 3 contraindications (risk typically outweighs benefit) and category 4 contraindications (unacceptable health risk) are listed for the copper IUD. Category 3 contraindications include untreated HIV/AIDS, recent and recurrent exposure to gonorrhea or chlamydia without adequate treatment, benign gestational trophoblastic disease, and ovarian cancer. Category 4 contraindications besides pregnancy and active genital tract infections (e.g. pelvic tuberculosis, sexually transmitted infections, endometritis) include malignant gestational trophoblastic disease, abnormal uterine bleeding, active cervical cancer, Wilson's disease, and active endometrial cancer. HIV infection is not itself a contraindication, as long as it is treated. There are no known drug interactions between the copper IUD and anti-retroviral medications.

== Device description ==
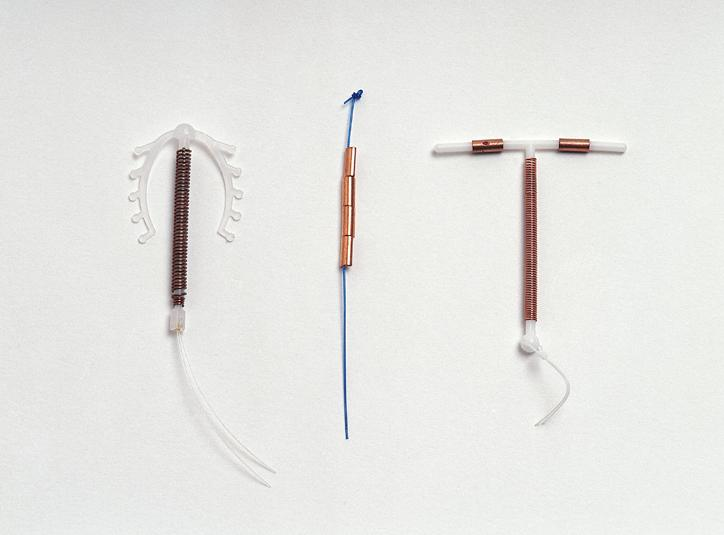
A variety of IUDs

There are various of models of copper IUDs available around the world. Most copper devices consist of a plastic (polyethylene) core that is wrapped in a copper wire. Many of the devices have a T-shape similar to the hormonal IUD. However, there are "frameless" copper IUDs available as well, the most popular of which is marketed as GyneFix. Early copper IUDs had copper around only the vertical stem, but more recent models have copper sleeves wrapped around the horizontal arms as well, increasing copper surface area and thereby effectiveness.

=== Insertion ===
A copper IUD can be inserted at any phase of the menstrual cycle, as long as pregnancy can be reliably excluded. It may be inserted in the immediate postpartum period (shortly after delivery of the placenta), and after an induced medical, surgical, or spontaneous abortion provided a genital tract infection can be reliably excluded. NSAIDs taken prior to the procedure and use of local anesthesia are recommended to reduce pain at the time of insertion.

=== Frameless IUDs ===
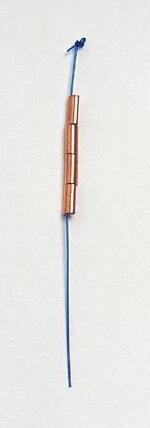
Gynefix 200 frameless IUD

The frameless IUD eliminates the use of the frame that gives conventional IUDs their signature T-shape. This change in design was made to reduce discomfort and expulsion risk associated with prior IUDs; without a solid frame, the frameless IUD should mold to the shape of the uterus. It may reduce expulsion and discontinuation rates compared to framed copper IUDs.

Gynefix is the only frameless IUD brand currently available. It consists of hollow copper tubes on a polypropylene thread. It is inserted through the cervix with a special applicator that anchors the thread to the fundus (top) of the uterus; the thread is then cut with a tail hanging outside of the cervix, similar to framed IUDs, or looped back into the cervical canal for patient comfort. When this tail is pulled, the anchor is released and the device can be removed. This requires more force than removing a T-shaped IUD, but results in comparable discomfort at the time of removal.

== Mechanism of action ==
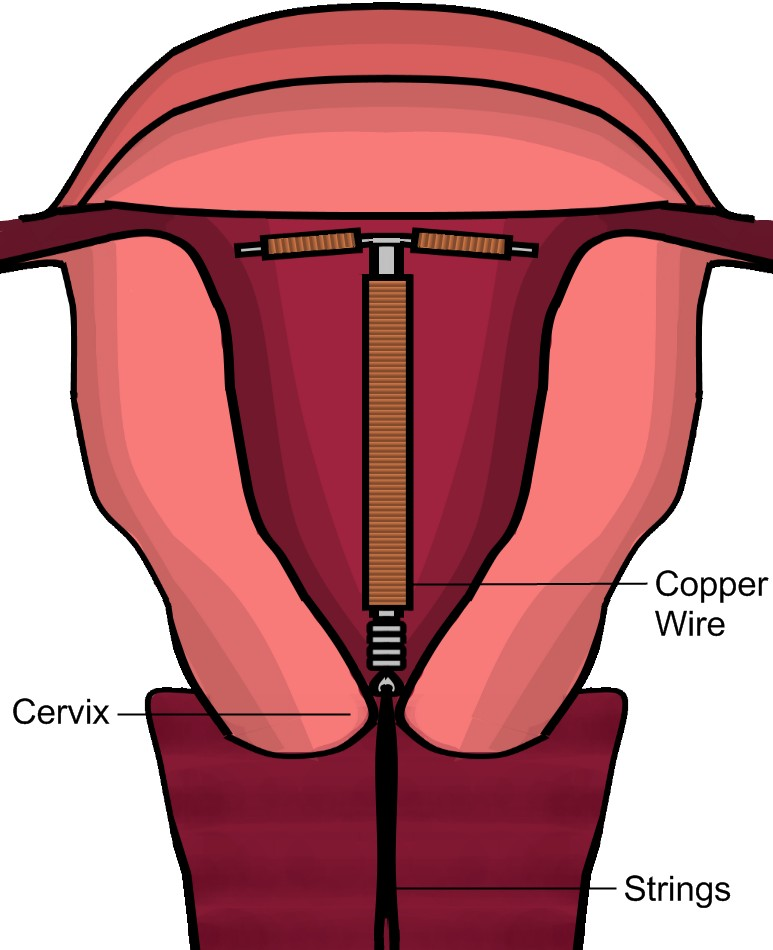
A diagram showing a copper IUD in place in the uterus.

The copper IUD's primary mechanism of action is to prevent fertilization. Copper causes a localized inflammatory response, which is spermicidal and causes the endometrium to be inhospitable.

Spermatozoa entering the uterine cavity and cervical mucus are consumed by local phagocytes, and are also directly killed by copper ions and lysosome contents. Presence of copper ions disrupts sperm motility, rendering fertilization improbable.

Although not a primary mechanism of action, copper may disrupt embryonic implantation, especially when used for emergency contraception. However, if implantation occurs, there is no evidence that copper affects subsequent development of a pregnancy or causes embryonic failure. Therefore, the copper IUD is considered to be a true contraceptive and not an abortifacient.

== Usage ==
Globally, the IUD is the most widely used method of reversible birth control. As of 2020, 161 million people used IUDs worldwide (including both non-hormonal and hormonal IUDs). As of 2020, IUDs were the most popular method of contraception in fourteen countries, mostly in Central and East Asia.

In Europe, as of 2006, copper IUD prevalence ranged from under 5% in the United Kingdom, Germany, and Austria to over 10% in Denmark and the Baltic States.

== History ==
Precursors to IUDs were first reported in the early 1900s. Developed from stem or wishbone pessaries, which were made of firm rubber or metal and had an anchor in the cervix, the stem on these devices extended into the uterine cavity. They were associated with high rates of genital tract infection, especially gonorrhea, and were not widely adopted.

The first intrauterine device to be contained entirely within the uterus was described in a German publication in 1909 by Richard Richter, who reported a ring-shaped device made of silk sutures with two ends protruding from the external os of the cervix for removal. A similar design was reported by Karl Pust, who wound the free ends of the suture tightly and attached them to a glass disc, which covered the external os. Ersatz versions were made using silk suture wrapped into a ring and embedded in a gelatin capsule, which was inserted into the uterus, where the gelatin dissolved.

In 1929, Ernst Gräfenberg of Germany published a report on an IUD made of silk sutures (Gräfenberg's ring), initially with a small amount of silver wire attached for visualization on x-ray, and then completely covered in silver wire. Because the silver was absorbed systemically and deposited in other tissues, causing a discoloration known as argyria, the device was then recreated with an alloy of copper, nickel, and zinc (then called German silver, also known as nickel silver). It was widely used in the UK and the Commonwealth, but discouraged from use in the US and Europe due to the perceived risk of infection, cancer, and inefficacy.

In 1934, Japanese physician Tenrei Ōta developed a variation of Gräfenberg's ring that contained a supportive structure in the center. The addition of this central disc lowered the IUD's expulsion rate and increased the surface area. Though his research was hampered by the fascist government's stance against contraception and his need to spend time in hiding, after World War II he returned to the development of IUDs. Gold and silver, which had been used by Gräfenberg, were in very short supply in post-war Japan, which led Ōta to other metals, silk, and nylon. By the end of the 1950s, there were 32 different frame shapes used in Japan, and larger studies showed no connection between these devices and development of endometrial cancer, which had been a theoretical concern due to the inflammatory properties of metals in the uterus. Ōta's devices were used in Japan until the 1980s.

The first plastic device was developed by Lazar Margulies and first trialed in 1959; it was made of a polyethylene ring filled with a radiopaque solution. The appearance gave rise to the colloquial term "coil", which persists despite the change in appearance of modern IUDs. Due to its size (6 mm), the cervix had to be dilated prior to insertion, it was poorly tolerated, and the device was prone to expulsion. Margulies modified it to add a beaded tail in 1962.

The Lippes Loop, a slightly smaller plastic device with a monofilament tail, was introduced in 1962 and gained in popularity over the Margulies device.

Stainless steel was introduced as an alternative to the copper-nickel-zinc alloy in the 1960s and 70s, and was subsequently widely used in China because of low manufacturing costs. The Chinese government banned production of steel IUDs in 1993 due to high failure rates (up to 10% per year).

American obstetrician Howard Tatum conceived the plastic T-shaped IUD in 1967, but its high failure rate (approximately 18%) made it nonviable. Shortly thereafter Jaime Zipper, a Chilean doctor, discovered that the nickel silver alloy had spermicidal properties due to its copper percentage, and added a copper sheath to the plastic T, bringing the failure rate to approximately 1%. It was found that copper-containing devices could be made in smaller sizes without compromising effectiveness, resulting in fewer side effects such as pain and bleeding. T-shaped devices had lower rates of expulsion due to their greater similarity to the shape of the uterus.

Tatum developed many different models of the copper IUD. He created the TCu 220 C, which had copper collars as opposed to a copper filament, which prevented metal loss and increased the lifespan of the device. Second generation copper-T IUDs were also introduced in the 1970s. These devices had higher surface areas of copper, and for the first time consistently achieved effectiveness rates of greater than 99%. The final model developed by Tatum, the TCu 380A, was approved by the US FDA in 1984 and is the most recommended model today.
