= Howard Tatum =

American obstetrician (1915–2002)

- Born: 1915; Philadelphia, Pennsylvania, U.S.
- Died: 2002 (aged 86–87)
- Occupation: Obstetrician
- Spouse: Elizabeth Connell (m. c. 1980)

Howard J. Tatum (1915 – 2002) was an American obstetrician. Along with Chilean physician Jaime Zipper, he invented the copper intrauterine device (IUD). The Tatum-T intrauterine device was the first T-shaped copper-bearing IUD to be sold in the United States, and its T-shaped design served as the foundation for other intrauterine devices.

== Early life and education ==
Howard J. Tatum was born in Philadelphia, Pennsylvania in 1915. Tatum earned a Bachelor of Arts in chemistry in 1936 and a Ph.D. in pharmacology and toxicology in 1941. In 1945, he earned a Doctor of Medicine, and in 1949, a degree in obstetrics and gynecology.

== Career ==
After completing his studies, Tatum was a professor of medicine at several American Universities. In 1966, Tatum became the associate director and senior scientist at the Center of Biomedical Research at the Population Council in New York City. Tatum was a founding member of the Association of Planned Parenthood Physicians, and served as its board president during the 1970s, before it was renamed to the Association of Reproductive Health Professionals. Tatum became a professor of obstetrics and gynaecology at Emory University in c. 1981. Tatum was also an Associate Fellow of the New York Obstetrical Society.

=== Intrauterine devices ===
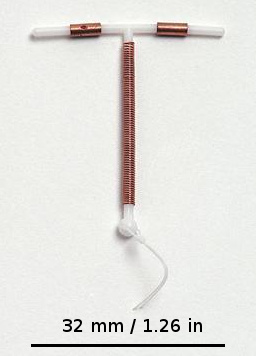
The Paragard T 380A is based on the original design by Tatum and Jaime Zipper

Tatum met his future collaborator, Jaime Zipper, during a sabbatical spent at the University of Santiago, Chile from 1964 to 1965. Upon learning of pain and bleeding caused by existing ring-shaped intrauterine devices (IUDs), in 1967 Tatum devised a T-shaped device that he believed would be more compatible with the shape of the contracted uterus. The simple plastic T caused fewer side effects compared to another commonly available IUD, with one fifth as many reports of pain and bleeding and half as many expulsions. However, its failure (pregnancy) rate was 18%. In 1969, Zipper discovered the contraceptive effects of intrauterine copper, and the two devised the T-shaped copper IUD by coiling copper wire around the vertical arm of Tatum's plastic T-shaped device. The invention was named the Copper-T 200, the TCu 200, or the Tatum-T. This copper-bearing device had a much lower failure rate of about 1%.

Tatum later developed many different models of the copper IUD. He created the TCu 220 C, which had copper collars instead of a copper filament, preventing metal loss and increasing the lifespan of the device to more than 20 years. Second generation copper-T IUDs were also introduced in the 1970s. These devices had higher surface areas of copper, and for the first time consistently achieved effectiveness rates of greater than 99%. The last model Tatum developed was the TCu 380A, which remains in widespread use.

Tatum sold the Tatum-T invention to the non-profit Population Council for $1 and earned nothing from sales of the devices. However, due to patent issues, it was beaten to the US market in 1974 by the Cu-7 200, also known as the "copper-7", which was marketed by G. D. Searle & Company as Gravigard. The Tatum-T was sold in the US beginning in 1980.

Following reports of serious medical problems associated with the Dalkon Shield intrauterine device, Tatum suggested the hypothesis at the initial August 1974 FDA hearing that the Dalkon Shield's multi-filament tail acted like a wick, drawing bacteria into the uterus. His further research supported the hypothesis, and Tatum wrote in a letter to the FDA on October 25, 1974 that, although his research did not definitively prove the link between the Dalkon Shield's tail and reported septic abortions and sepsis, the data suggested a causal relationship that he believed was sufficient to recommend against clinical usage of the device. His research helped to convince the FDA of the Dalkon Shield's potential harms, and the committee extended a moratorium on sales of the device in the US.

After the injuries and deaths caused by the Dalkon Shield, the high costs of lawsuits spilled over to other IUD manufacturers. As a result, Searle removed both the Tatum-T and the copper-7 from the US markets in 1986. The Copper-T devices remained available for use in Canada. In 1988, the Paragard T380A copper IUD, based on Tatum's designs, was introduced to the US market. Many modern hormonal IUDs are also based on Tatum's T-shaped design.

== Personal life ==
Tatum married doctor and reproductive healthcare advocate Elizabeth B. Connell in c. 1980, and the two regularly collaborated in their work. In 1981, they moved to Atlanta, Georgia, and both joined the faculty of Emory University. Tatum died in 2002 with Alzhiemer's disease.
