= Tenrei Ōta =

Japanese obstetrician-gynaecologist and politician (1900 – 1985)

- 太田 典礼
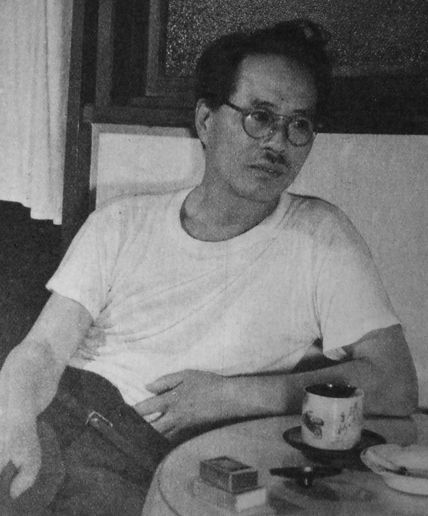
- Ōta in 1953

Member of the House of Representatives
- In office 25 April 1947 – 23 December 1948
- Preceded by: Constituency established
- Succeeded by: Kenji Kawada
- Constituency: Kyoto 2nd

Personal details
- Born: Takeo Ōta; 7 October 1900 Yosa, Kyoto, Japan
- Died: 5 December 1985 (aged 85)
- Party: Independent
- Other political affiliations: JCP (1946–1947); JSP (1947–1948); LFP (1948–1949)
- Education: Kyushu Imperial University
- Occupation: Obstetrician-gynaecologist, politician

Tenrei Ōta (Japanese: 太田 典礼 Ōta Tenrei), born Takeo Ōta (太田 武夫 Ōta Takeo; 1900–1985) was a Japanese obstetrician-gynaecologist and politician. He invented the Ōta ring, an early intrauterine device (IUD). Throughout his life, he was an outspoken advocate for contraception, abortion, and euthanasia. Some of his beliefs were rooted in eugenics, and during his time as a member of Japan's House of Representatives, he drafted and co-sponsored the Eugenic Protection Law.

== Early life and education ==
Takeo Ōta was born in 1900 to a physician's family in the Migochi village of the Kyoto Prefecture in Japan. In 1925, he earned his doctorate from Kyushu University. He then specialised in gynaecology at Kyoto University. He studied human cancer cells to obtain his Ph.D. from Kyoto University, but was denied his degree in 1934 due to his "leftist inclinations". After Japan was defeated in World War II, he was awarded the degree.

== Career ==
Ōta began studying contraceptive methods in 1927. Few of his fellow scientists and doctors were interested in the topic, deeming it indecent. He began by studying existing methods, focusing both on barrier contraceptives such as sponges and stem pessaries as well as on early attempts at intrauterine devices to prevent implantation of a fertilised egg. Concerned that contraceptive methods promoted by Margaret Sanger during a visit to Japan in 1922 were "unreliable" and "unscientific", he began working his own device.

In 1931, he learned about Gräfenberg's ring, an early IUD design introduced by Ernst Gräfenberg in 1929, in which a flexible silk ring was wrapped with silver wire. In 1932 or 1933, Ōta invented a modified version, which he tested on relatives and acquaintances. He originally called it the "Precea ring", using an English-Japanese term meaning "pressure", but it later became known as the "Ōta ring". In his early designs, he combined Gräfenberg's ring design with previous experiments where gold balls were placed in the uterus. The experiments he was building upon tended to be short-lived as the balls were expelled from the uterus, and the addition of the ring was intended to improve retention. First he tried combining multiple gold balls with the ring-shaped device, which he modified by adding spokes that joined in the middle. Later, he modified his design to use one central gold disc, which was attached by spokes to the outer ring. His early versions were made from silver or gold. He also experimented with a plastic version, possibly making him the first to invent a plastic IUD, but he only had access to poor-quality plastics that he ultimately determined were unsuitable.

Ōta was an active participant in the Japanese birth control movement during that time period, supporting access to contraceptives and advocating for his design. However, political shifts in the country, including Japan's later alliance with the Axis powers, contributed to hostility towards contraceptives and those advocating for them, particularly amid the rise in pronatalist beliefs that Japan needed to increase its population to strengthen its military power. In 1930, limits and bans were placed on the sale of "harmful contraceptives", which would include the Ōta ring, and in 1937, the publication of written material on birth control was prohibited. Around the time of the Second Sino-Japanese War, the government officially adopted stricter population planning policies, using the slogan ume yo fuyase yo (transl. give birth and multiply), and banned artificial contraception methods and abortion in 1941. Amid this shift, Ōta became a political target due to his promotion of birth control and ties to other socialist activists, and he was arrested twice and forced to stop his birth control–related activities. Ōta changed his name from Takeo to Tenrei to try to avoid further arrests, and later went into hiding.

After World War II ended, Ōta returned to his advocacy and work on the Ōta ring. He opened a birth control clinic as early as November 1945. Due to postwar rationing of silver and gold, he began trialing synthetic materials for his Ōta ring including nylon, vinyl, polyethylene, and combinations thereof. He also added notches to the exterior ring of his design in 1945, intending to reduce expulsion. However, he later determined that that model tended to become too firmly lodged in the uterus, making it difficult or impossible to remove. His final version of the Ōta ring was made from a ring of nylon-wrapped polyethylene, with a central polyethylene sphere attached by threads. Sometime after 1948, Ōta submitted his design to the Ministry of Health and Welfare, but it was rejected over concerns that inserting a foreign device into the uterus could carry health risks that outweighed the benefits. Although the device enjoyed support from some practising clinicians and more individualist doctors, the more establishment doctors with more political influence were fearful of contraceptive devices that might not be 100% safe. However, Ōta and other doctors were permitted to conduct clinical trials. Ōta appealed the decision to reject his design, and the Ministry of Health and Welfare established a Special Committee on Intrauterine Contraceptive Devices in September 1953. However, neither Ōta nor any of the doctors who supported the ring were included in the consultation, despite the inclusion of several who opposed it. The Committee upheld the rejection, and further limited use of the device outside of clinical trials.

In the 1960s, the government's stance on IUDs shifted, owing in part to the global proliferation of such devices, more knowledge about IUDs among the public, and increased clinical research. Simultaneously, Ōta's work began to be known outside of Japan. Astumi Ishihama, a Japanese doctor who had performed clinical trials with the Ōta ring, published a highly positive English-language article about the ring in the Yokohama Medical Journal. In 1962, Ishihama was invited to present at the First International Conference on the IUD held in New York. He introduced the Ōta ring to more people outside of Japan, including the Population Council's Alan Frank Guttmacher. In turn, at the International Family Planning Conference held in Chile in 1967, Guttmacher presented the Ōta ring to a public audience, describing Ōta as the "father of the IUD". Japan's Ministry of Health and Welfare approved the Ōta ring and the Yusei ring, developed by a former colleague of Ōta's, as medical contraceptives in 1974.

== Political career ==
Ōta was a socialist and outspoken advocate for birth control, abortion access, and euthanasia. He held eugenicist beliefs, which influenced his advocacy and beliefs.

In 1945, Ōta created the Sanji Seigen Domei (transl. Birth Control League or Birth Control Alliance), which was one of the numerous small birth control advocacy groups established during that period. These groups remained fairly separate until 1954, when they joined together as the Family Planning Federation of Japan.

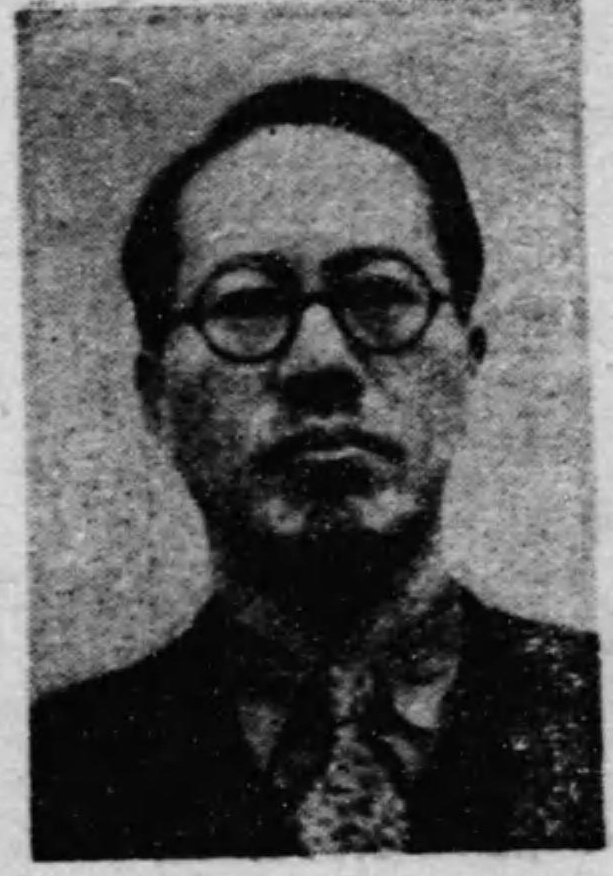
Ōta in the 1947 House of Representatives handbook

Ōta, a member of the Japan Socialist Party, was elected as a representative in Kyoto's 2nd district in 1947. He and two fellow socialists and birth control activists, Shidzue Katō and Masako Fukuda, introduced the Eugenic Protection Law (優生保護法, Yūsei hogo hō) to the House of Representatives in December 1947. Ōta had been the one to choose the name, and coauthored the original version. The law's stated goal was "to protect maternal health and life, and to prevent the birth of inferior offspring, thus contributing to the construction of a cultured nation" by legalising abortion and contraception, and strengthening eugenic policies. The bill would have authorised voluntary and involuntary sterilisations, permitted doctors to counsel patients regarding contraception, and broadly legalised abortions. The bill stalled, and Ōta suggested that the Supreme Commander for the Allied Powers had been hesitant to accept a law seemingly aimed at tackling two separate topics: birth control and eugenics. However, Ōta and his colleagues argued that both items were designed to improve the "quality of the nation".

In June 1948, the bill was reintroduced and passed into law after the socialists revised it with the aid and cosponsorship of ob-gyn and Councillor Yasaburō Taniguchi. The revised bill aimed "to prevent the birth of eugenically inferior offspring, and to protect maternal health and life", and it authorised both voluntary and involuntary sterilisations, and abortions in more limited circumstances. Contraception access was not included in the revised version. Despite the changes to his original version of the law, Ōta was highly supportive, and considered it "unprecedented" and "extremely progressive".

Although eugenics began to develop a negative reputation in the 1960s and 1970s, Ōta never distanced himself from the law. Even after attitudes began to change, in 1967 Ōta published writings outlining "an ideal plan" where he suggested dividing the population into three categories (A, B, and C), where men in category A would be allowed to procreate with women in categories A or B, and all others would be sterilised to improve society.

== Euthanasia advocacy ==
In the 1960s, Ōta became a strong advocate for legalising euthanasia. In 1963 he suggested that a euthanasia society should be established, and in 1976 he founded the Japan Euthanasia Society (Nihon anrakushi kyōkai), which later became the Japan Society for Dying with Dignity (Nihon songenshi kyōkai). That same year, he organised a global conference for right-to-die societies in Tokyo, where the World Federation of Right to Die Societies was established. Ōta is credited with introducing the concept of advance healthcare directives to Japan.

Ōta's proposals generally involved passive euthanasia by withdrawing end-of-life medical care and administering pain relief. He suggested that providing medical care to extend the lives of those who were terminally ill and had expressed a wish to die was in "violation of human dignity".

Ōta's euthanasia advocacy has been criticised by disability rights advocates. Ōta advocated for euthanasia not only in cases where the individual wished to die, but also in the cases of people deemed to be "burdensome" on society. In one of his writings, Ōta suggested, "would it not be ideal if there were fewer [disabled or elderly people]?"

== See also ==
- Abortion in Japan
- Birth control in Japan
- Shidzue Katō – Japanese politician and birth control advocate
