= Lazar C. Margulies =

American gynecologist and obstetrician

Lazar C. Margulies (1895 – 1982) was a physician who specialized in obstetrics and gynecology. He is best known for developing a type of safe intrauterine device (IUD) made of plastic.

== Biography ==
Margulies was born in Galicia, which later became part of Poland. He served in the Austro-Hungarian army in World War I in their medical corps. On 11 June 1919, while a student at University in Vienna, he married fellow medical student Rafaella Pomeranz. They had two children, Stephen (later Steven, born 28 April 1927) and Bibi (later Phoebe, born 30 December 1931). Margulies completed his studies at the University of Vienna in 1921. Following this, he continued his training while working as a gynecologist and obstetrician.

Margulies worked in Vienna from 1929 until 1938. Later, as the Nazi movement spread, because he was Jewish, he was arrested as a political prisoner and held in Buchenwald as inmate number 20124 in Block 20. On 17 February 1939 he was put into the standard striped clothing worn by inmates and given a new number 5585. He was released from Buchenwald on 28 April 1939 after his family had made plans to emigrate to Great Britain.

Margulies fled to Britain in 1940. In 1941 he emigrated to the United States where he settled in New York City. Margulies started working at Mount Sinai Medical Center in 1954.

Margulies was working in the obstetrics department of Mount Sinai in 1958 when he suggested his idea for a new IUD to the head of the department, Alan F. Guttmacher. Margulies has successfully used IUDs in Berlin. Guttmacher approved Margulies' idea to create a safer type of IUD using plastic. Margulies developed a spiral-shaped IUD in 1960. It was made of thermoplastic and introduced in a thin tube and then inserted with a plastic plunger. After it was expelled from its tubing, the plastic IUD retained its shape inside the uterus. The method of insertion Margulies developed meant that a woman's cervix did not have to be dilated for the insertion to take place. Margulies' method solved many problems inherent in metallic IUDs. Guttmacher allowed Margulies to do clinical trials which were successful. Margulies presented the clinical results and demonstrated the plastic IUD at the first international symposium on IUDs in New York in 1962. His invention was patented in 1965 and assigned to Mount Sinai by Margulies.

Margulies died in 1982 of a cerebral hemorrhage in Manhattan.
