= Elizabeth Connell (doctor) =

American doctor and proponent of women's reproductive health

- Born: Elizabeth Kincaid Bishop; November 17, 1925; Springfield, Massachusetts, U.S.
- Died: August 20, 2018 (aged 92); Framingham, Massachusetts, U.S.
- Education: University of Pennsylvania
- Occupations: Doctor and scientist
- Known for: Family planning, women's health and women's equality
- Spouses: John Connell (div. 1970) Howard Tatum (died 2002)

Elizabeth B. Connell (November 17, 1925 – August 20, 2018) was an American doctor and proponent of women's reproductive health.

== Early life and education ==
Elizabeth Kincaid Bishop was born in Springfield, Massachusetts on November 17, 1925, to college professors Homer and Margaret Bishop. She got her medical degree from the University of Pennsylvania in 1951 and began her career as a general practitioner in Blue Hill, Maine.

== Career ==
Observing the effects of botched abortions and unwanted pregnancies on her patients' lives in rural Maine contributed to Bishop's later views on abortion and reproductive care. Instead of becoming an occupational therapist as she had planned, she trained in surgery, specializing in obstetrics. She moved to New York City in 1960 to attend Mount Sinai Hospital for her residency and she became part of the faculty at Columbia University. During the 1960s, she helped to open a women's health clinic in East Harlem.

Connell was an associate professor of obstetrics and gynecology in 1970 with the Columbia College of Physicians and Surgeons. She toured parts of the world assisting in setting up health facilities and talking about women's health. Connell began a media tour in the United States in the 1980s which saw her appear on The Phil Donahue Show throwing condoms into the audience. She also moderated a discussion in Washington including the feminist leaders Betty Friedan and Gloria Steinem. She moved to Atlanta in 1981 where she was part of the department of obstetrics and gynecology at Emory University. She was an editor of the bimonthly obstetrics-focused monograph The Contraception Report from 1990 to 2001.

Connell was a scientist who worked on methods of contraception. She wrote three books on contraception and worked as a researcher with the Centers for Disease Control and Prevention.

Prior to the 1973 Roe v. Wade decision, Connell advocated for the legalization of abortion. While leading a committee to advise the Food and Drug Administration, she raised concerns about the health risks of breast implants. In 1970, she admonished a Congressional subcommittee for causing "panic" about oral contraceptives, stating that it had resulted in "dozens of unwanted pregnancies". She was known for her work on family planning, women's health and women's equality.

== Personal life ==
Connell's first marriage, to Dr. John Connell, ended in 1970 with divorce. In c. 1980 she married Dr. Howard Tatum, an obstetrician with whom she often collaborated. She had six children and three stepchildren. Tatum died in 2002. Connell died of congestive heart failure in Framingham, Massachusetts on August 20, 2018.

== Bibliography ==
- The Contraception Sourcebook. McGraw-Hill Education. 2001. ISBN 978-0-07-139945-6.
- Sexually Transmitted Diseases – 1985
- Reproductive Health Care Manual – 1985
- Managing Patients With Intrauterine Devices – 1985
