= Long-acting reversible contraceptives =

Birth control effective for an extended period

Long-acting reversible contraceptives (LARC)

Background
- Type: Various (includes hormonal and non-hormonal options)
- First use: ?

Pregnancy rates (first year)
- Perfect use: ?
- Typical use: ?

Usage
- Reversibility: Yes
- User reminders: ?

Advantages and disadvantages
- STI protection: No

Long-acting reversible contraceptives (LARC) are methods of birth control that provide effective contraception for an extended period without requiring user action. They include hormonal and non-hormonal intrauterine devices (IUDs) and subdermal hormonal contraceptive implants. They are the most effective reversible methods of contraception because their efficacy is not reliant on patient compliance. The failure rates of IUDs and implants is less than 1% per year.

LARCs are often recommended to people seeking convenient and cost effective contraception. In one study, LARC users saved thousands of dollars over a five-year period compared to those who buy condoms and birth control pills. LARCs can generally be safely and effectively used by people of any body weight, adolescents, and people who have not yet had children.

In 2008, the American College of Obstetrics and Gynecologists (ACOG) launched The Long-Acting Reversible Contraception Program with the intention to reduce rates of unintended pregnancy by promoting LARCs, often referred to as a "LARC-first" model. Rates of LARC use in the United States rose steadily in that time frame, from 3.7% in 2007 to 10% in 2019. LARC methods are most popular amongst people in their late teens and early twenties. LARC use varies globally, with different regions reporting different use rates. An estimated 161 million people of reproductive age use an IUD and an additional 25 million use an implant; this is 19.4% of the estimated global population of women of reproductive age.

== Methods ==
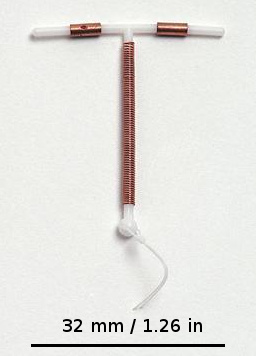
Copper IUD

LARC methods include IUDs and the subdermal implant.

IUDs, also sometimes referred to as IUS (intrauterine system) or IUC (intrauterine contraception), can come in hormonal or nonhormonal varieties.

- Hormonal intrauterine devices are sold under the brand names Mirena, Skyla, Liletta, and others.
- Nonhormonal intrauterine device with copper are sold under the brand names copper-T and Paraguard.
- Subdermal contraceptive implant are sold under the brand names Nexplanon, Implanon, Norplant, Jadelle, and others.

== Medical use ==
=== Contraception ===
LARCs have higher rates of efficacy than do other forms of contraception. This difference is likely due to the difference between "perfect use" and "typical use". Perfect use indicates complete adherence to medication schedules and guidelines. Typical use describes effectiveness in real-world conditions, where patients may not fully adhere to medication regimens. LARC methods require little to no user action after insertion; therefore, LARC perfect use failure rates are the same as their typical use failure rates. LARC failure rates are comparable to those of sterilization. LARCs and sterilization differ in their reversibility. Providing early postpartum contraception results in comparable continued IUD use at six months and higher implant continuation rates at six months compared to delayed provision.

The implant has a 0.05% failure rate in the first year of use, the levonorgestrel (hormonal) IUD has a 0.1% failure rate in the first year of use, and the copper IUD has a 0.8% failure rate in first year of use. These rates are comparable to those of permanent sterilization procedures, leading to conclusions that LARCs should be offered as "first-line contraception."

=== Additional Uses ===
LARCs can also be used to treat other conditions, primarily by regulating or stopping the bleeding portion of a user's menstrual cycle. LARCs may be used to treat endometriosis and heavy menstrual bleeding. They can also be useful in treating painful menstruation.

Additionally, a copper IUD can be used as emergency contraception if inserted within five days of unprotected sex. This timeframe may be extended if the date of ovulation is known; the copper IUD must be inserted within 5 days of ovulation.

== Side effects and risks ==
Side effects and risks for LARCs vary by type of LARC, with hormonal IUDs, non-hormonal IUDs, and implants all entailing different side effects and risks.

=== Side effects ===
Hormonal IUDs have similar side effects to other forms of hormonal contraception, such as combined and progesterone only oral contraceptives. Hormonal IUDs most frequently cause irregular menstrual bleeding. Other side effects include acne, breast tenderness, headaches, nausea, and mood changes.

The most common side effects of non-hormonal or copper IUDs are increased pain and heavy bleeding during menstruation, and spotting between menstruation. Impacts on menstruation may decrease over the lifespan of the IUD, but spotting between menstruation may become more frequent over time. For some users, these side effects lead them to discontinue use.

The most common side effect of the contraceptive implant is irregular bleeding, which includes both reduced and increased levels of bleeding. Other side effects include mood changes and mild insulin resistance.

=== Risks ===
IUD use carries some additional risks. Both hormonal and non-hormonal IUDs may lead to developing non-cancerous ovarian cysts. It is also possible that an IUD may be expelled (fall out) from the uterus. The IUD may also perforate (tear) the uterine wall. This is extremely rare and a medical emergency.

== Society and culture ==
=== Cost and benefit ===
All LARCs are designed to last for at least three years, with some options (Paraguard Copper IUD) lasting for at least ten years. Although they have higher up-front costs (out-of-pocket costs can range between $500 and $1300), that cost purchases coverage for longer than other contraceptive methods, which are often purchased on a monthly basis (for hormonal birth control methods like pills, patches, or rings.) When accounting for upfront costs, failure rates, and side effects, researchers estimate that the most cost effective means of contraception are the Copper IUD, vasectomy, and the levonorgestrel IUD (such as a Mirena). One researcher estimates that use of the levonorgestrel IUD can be up to 31% cheaper than using non-LARC methods such as birth control pills, patch, ring, or injectables. Regardless, the initial out of pocket cost is still too high for many patients, and is one of the biggest barriers to LARC use. Studies conducted in California and St. Louis have shown that rates of LARC usage are dramatically higher when the costs of the methods are either covered or removed.

The Colorado Family Planning Initiative (CPFI), a six-year $23 million privately funded program to expand access to LARCs, This program specifically provided no-cost LARCs to low-income women across the state of Colorado, with the intention of preventing unintended pregnancies within specific groups deemed at high-risk of unintended pregnancy. This program decreased unplanned adolescent pregnancies in Colorado by about half. There was a similar decline of unplanned pregnancies in unmarried women under 25 who have not finished high school. Use of LARC methods by children of child-bearing age in the state increased to 20% during the 2009–2014 period. A 2017 study found that CPFI "reduced the teen birth rate in counties with clinics receiving funding by 6.4 percent over five years. These effects were concentrated in the second through fifth years of the program and in counties with relatively high poverty rates."

Same-Day Access

In the United States, the Centers for Disease Control and Prevention identifies unnecessary examinations, testing, and delays in starting contraception as barriers to access. Its 2024 recommendations support avoiding unnecessary delays while providing contraceptive services according to individual preferences and medical circumstances.

For medically eligible individuals, IUDs and contraceptive implants can generally be placed at any point in the menstrual cycle when a clinician is reasonably certain that the person is not pregnant; waiting for the menstrual period is unnecessary. Pregnancy assessment requirements differ between methods. When pregnancy cannot be excluded, IUD placement is deferred, whereas an implant may be considered with a follow-up pregnancy test in two to four weeks.

When screening for gonorrhea and chlamydia is indicated, it can generally be performed at the time of IUD placement without delaying insertion. However, IUD placement is contraindicated in people with current purulent cervicitis or known current gonorrhea or chlamydia infection.

=== Promotion ===
LARC usage
| Russia | 32% |
| France | 27% |
| Austria | 23% |
| Georgia | 23% |
| Bulgaria | 18% |
| Germany | 11% |
| Romania | 10% |
| United States | 10% |
| Australia | 7% |

The United Kingdom Department of Health has actively promoted LARC use since 2008, particularly for young people; following on from the October 2005 National Institute for Health and Clinical Excellence guidelines, which promoted LARC provision in the United Kingdom, accurate and detailed counseling for women about these methods, and training of healthcare professionals to provide these methods. Giving advice on these methods of contraception has been included in the 2009 Quality and Outcomes Framework "good practice" for primary care.

The use of long-acting reversible contraceptives in the United States has increased nearly fivefold from 1.5% in 2002 to 7.2% in 2011–2013. Increasing access to long-acting reversible contraceptives was listed by the Centers for Disease Control and Prevention as one of the top public health priorities for reducing teen pregnancy and unintended pregnancy in the United States. One study of female family planning providers showed that they were significantly more likely to use LARCs than the general population (41.7% compared to 12.0%) suggesting that the general population has less information or access to LARCs.

=== LARC-First models and backlash ===
Guidelines released in 2009 by the American College of Obstetricians and Gynecologists (ACOG) state that LARC methods are considered to be the first-line option for birth control in the United States, and are recommended for the majority of women. According to the CDC Medical Eligibility Criteria for Contraceptive Use, LARC methods are recommended for the majority of women who have had their first menstruation, regardless of whether they have had any pregnancies. The American Academy of Pediatrics (AAP) in a policy statement and technical report published in October 2014 recommended LARC methods for adolescents.

In the years since ACOG made these recommendations, many researchers have evaluated the impact of the LARC-first model. Because it prioritized the importance of effectiveness of method in contraceptive counseling, patient preferences and priorities were not given adequate attention within contraceptive counseling. Researchers have found that patients experience over-enthusiasm about a particular method as coercive. ACOG practitioners have since come forward with an attempt at re-balancing recommendations to center patient needs and desires in contraceptive counseling. The organization has also formally denounced coercive contraceptive practices, including those that incentivize use of contraception, incentivize use of a particular type of contraception, or make it harder to discontinue use of contraception.

== See also ==
- Contraceptive vaginal ring
