= R. G. Waldeck =

American writer and journalist (1898–1982)

Rosie Goldschmidt Waldeck (born Rosa Goldschmidt; August 24, 1898 – August 8, 1982), also known as Rosie Waldeck and by several other variants of her name, was a German-born American author of several works including Prelude to the Past; the Autobiography of a Woman and Athene Palace. The former narrates, among other things, the 1930 spy trial involving Berlin publisher Ullstein-Verlag (she was married at the time to Dr. Franz Ullstein, a son of Leopold Ullstein); the latter narrates events in elite diplomatic circles in Bucharest, Romania during World War II.

She converted to Catholicism from Judaism sometime in her life, and became an American on April 3, 1939. She was born into a banking family, and in 1920 received a doctorate in sociology from the University of Heidelberg, where she studied under Alfred Weber. From the 1930s, she was based in the United States. She was in Bucharest from June 1940 to January 1941 as a correspondent for Newsweek: Her book Athene Palace narrates this sojourn; the title refers to the Athénée Palace hotel, "short of one 'e' and of accents for no other reason than simplicity and readability."

Waldeck's 1952 article "Homosexual International" in Human Events, which claimed that gay people were part of "a world-wide conspiracy against society," was read into the Congressional Record shortly after its publication. The article also claimed that "members of one conspiracy are prone to join another conspiracy" and that this made gay people more likely to support communism, a key point during the Lavender Scare.

The surname Waldeck came from the German count Armin Wolrad Graf von Waldeck, who was at least her third husband. She was earlier married to German-born medical doctor and scientist Ernst Gräfenberg and to the aforementioned Dr. Franz Ullstein.

== Works ==
- Prelude to the past; the autobiography of a woman (1934)
- Athene Palace (1942)
- Meet Mr. Blank, The Leader of Tomorrow's Germans (1943)
- Lustre in the Sky (1946)
- The Emperor's Duchess (1948)
- Europe Between The Acts (1951)

Source for list:
