= Jaime Zipper =

Chilean physician & scientist (1926–2011)

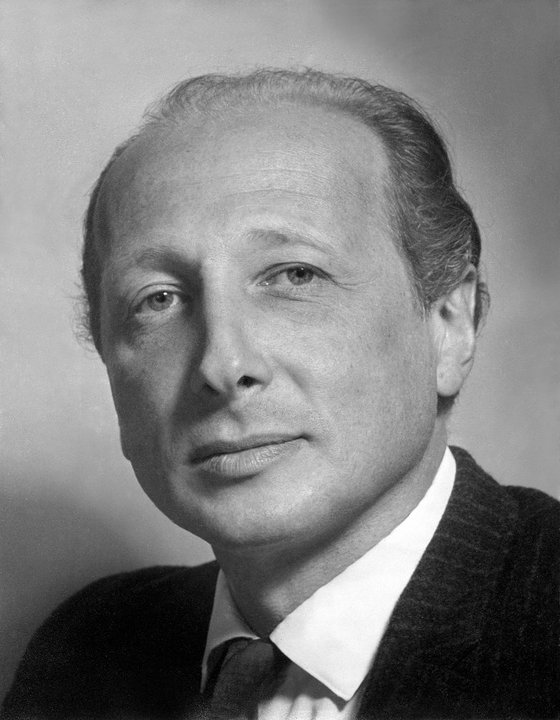
- Born: January 20, 1926; Lviv, Ukraine
- Died: March 16, 2011 (aged 85); Santiago, Chile
- Education: University of Chile
- Occupation: Physician
- Spouse: Irma Latorre Vicentini

Jaime Zipper (20 January 1926 – 16 March 2011) was a Chilean physician and scientist who, with American Howard Tatum, created the first T-shaped copper intrauterine device. Zipper discovered the contraceptive properties of intrauterine copper.

== Early life and education ==
The child of Polish Jews Gustavo Zipper and Juana Antonia Abragan, Jaime Zipper was born in Lviv, Ukraine. The family moved to Mulchén, Chile, and then to Santiago.

He studied at the Liceo José Victorino Lastarria and subsequently completed his secondary education at the Internado Nacional Barros Arana. From an early age, Zipper showed a deep interest in science, and went on to study medicine at the Universidad de Chile. He earned his doctoral degree in 1953 with a thesis entitled "Contribución al estudio de la Hidatidosis en Chile" (transl. "Contribution to the study of echinococcosis in Chile"). In his final three years of study, he was an assistant professor of parasitology.

Between 1961 and 1962, he was a postdoctoral researcher in reproductive physiology at the Worcester Foundation for Experimental Biology in the United States. There, he worked with Gregory Goodwin Pincus, the developer of the first oral contraceptive pill.

== Academic career ==
In 1963, he became associate professor of physiology in the Department of Physiology and Biophysics at the University of Chile. Between 1967 and 1969 he served as the medical head of the Department of Human Reproduction of the World Health Organization in Switzerland, and he remained a professor during that time. In 1981 he was awarded tenure as a full professor of physiology, and in 2004 he was named professor emeritus at the University of Chile.

In 1959, Zipper introduced the first IUD made in Chile, dubbed the Zipper ring. It was made of a nylon monofilament, and was implemented in maternity hospitals for underserved populations, notably the Hospital Barros Luco. He investigated older devices, such as the Gräfenberg ring, made with a copper-nickel-zinc alloy (nickel silver), whose efficacy was erroneously attributed to metal in general, not copper. Zipper concluded that the spermicidal activity of the device was related to the percentage of copper in the alloy, and worked with international colleagues, notably the Americans Jack Lippes and Howard Tatum, to develop a more effective IUD. In 1970, based on his research, he introduced a T shaped device made with copper, a design that persists in many modern copper IUDs.

Zipper also was known for his research into a technique for permanent sterilization using a small dose of quinacrine delivered transcervically.

== Death and legacy ==
Zipper died in the morning of March 16, 2011 of complications due to Parkinson's disease. He was recognized for his contributions to global health in reducing maternal mortality due to unintended pregnancy and unsafe abortion.

== Awards and honors ==
- Premio de la Sociedad Chilena de Obstetricia y Ginecología, 1954.
- Samuel L. Siegler Lecture of the American Fertility Society, for his publication “Human Fertility Control by Transvaginal Application of Quinacrine on the Fallopian Tube”, 1970.
- Ernst Gräfenberg Prize, Germany, 1983.
- Award for his relevant contributions in the field of human reproduction, 10th World Congress of Human Reproduction in Brazil, 1999
- Honorary Member of the Sistema Nacional de Salud of the Chilean Ministry of Health, 1999.
- Honored as one of the forebears of modern contraception by Centro Latinoamericano Salud y Mujer (CELSAM) , 2000.
- Honored at the 17th congress of FIGO, 2003
- Recognized by the Chilean Ministry of Health for his research into contraception, 2004

== Publications ==
- Zipper [et al]. “Influence of hormonal factors and intrauterine contraceptive devices on the acceptance of an intrauterine autograft”. Am J Obstet Gynecol. 1969 Jan; 103(1): 86-9.
- Zipper [et al]. “Metallic copper as an intrauterine contraceptive adjunct to the “T” device”. Am J Obstet Gynecol. 1969 Dec 15; 105(8): 1274-8.
- Zipper [et al]. “Human fertility control by transvaginal application of quinacrine on the fallopian tube”. Fertil Steril. 1970 Aug; 21(8):851-9.
- Zipper [et al]. “Studies of the physiological activity of IUDs containing copper”. Contraception. 1975 Jul; 12(1): 1-10.
- Zipper [et al]. “Quinacrine nonsurgical female sterilization: a reassessment of safety and efficacy”. Fertil Steril. 1985 Sep; 44(3):293-8.
- Zipper [et al]. “Quinacrine and copper, compounds with anticonceptive and antineoplastic activity”. Contraception. 1994 Sep; 50(3):243-51.
- Zipper [et al]. “Quinacrine sterilization: a retrospective”. Int J Gynaecol Obstet. 2003 Oct; 83 Suppl 2:S7-11. Review
