= Intrauterine device =

Form of birth control

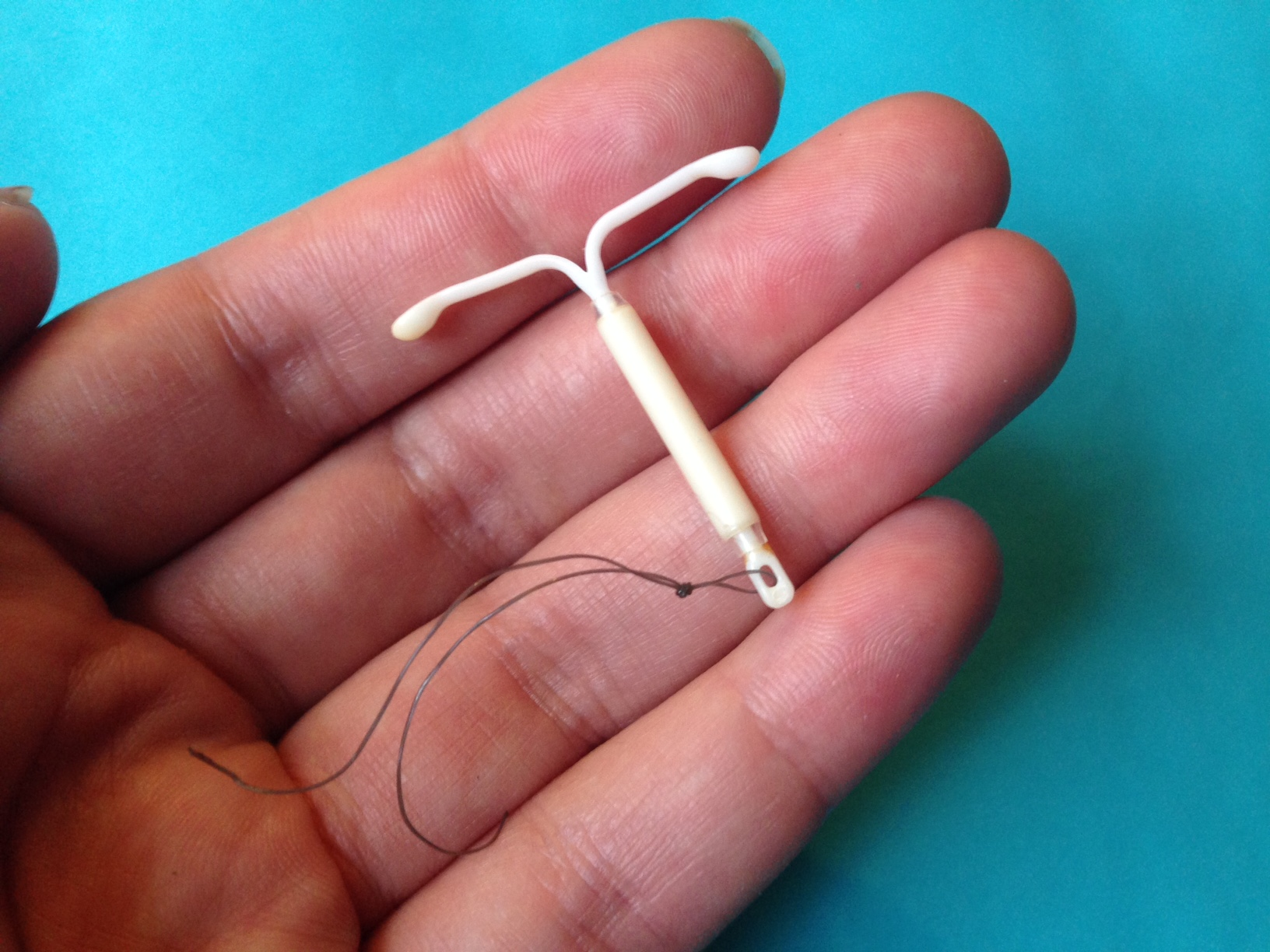
- Mirena IUD with hand

Background
- Type: Intrauterine
- First use: 1800s
- Synonyms: Intrauterine system

Failure rates (first year)
- Perfect use: <1%
- Typical use: <1%

Usage
- Duration effect: 3-10+ years depending on type
- Reversibility: Rapid
- User reminders: Check strings
- Clinic review: 1-3 initial visits including decision-making, patient education, and follow-up

Advantages and disadvantages
- STI protection: No
- Weight: No effect
- Period disadvantages: May increase(copper)
- Period advantages: May decrease(hormonal)
- Benefits: Length of efficacy without action needed
- Risks: Invasive insertion, expulsion

The intrauterine device (IUD), also known as an intrauterine contraceptive device (IUCD or ICD), is a small, T-shaped birth control device that is inserted into the uterus to prevent pregnancy. As a form of long-acting reversible contraception (LARC), IUDs last for many years depending on the exact product.

IUDs are a safe and effective birth control method that can be divided into two major categories based on the mechanism the device uses to prevent pregnancy: hormonal (levonorgestrel) IUDs and copper IUDs. Both types of IUDs can be used in most women, including adolescents, those who have never been pregnant, and those who have previously had children. They do not affect breastfeeding and can be inserted immediately after delivery. They may also be used immediately after an abortion. Globally, 19.4% of women of reproductive age use intrauterine contraception according to 2019 data. The IUD has a more invasive insertion procedure than other birth control methods. Pain management for the insertion is evolving and practitioners may offer anything from NSAIDs and lidocaine to more complex arrangements like nitrous oxide or IV sedation. However, among birth control methods, IUDs, along with other contraceptive implants, result in the greatest satisfaction among users.

Both hormonal and copper IUDs have failure rates of <1%, meaning less than 1 in 100 individuals with an IUD have an unintended pregnancy. In comparison, combined hormonal contraception methods (oral pill, vaginal ring, transdermal patch, etc.) have a failure rate of about 2% with perfect use and 4-7% with typical use. Barrier methods, such as the male condom, have a failure rate of approximately 13% and fertility awareness methods (often referred to as natural family planning or the rhythm method), have a failure rate of 22%. Once an IUD is removed, even after long-term use, fertility returns to normal rapidly.

Hormonal IUDs often reduce menstrual bleeding by up to 90% or stop menstruation altogether. Users may experience daily spotting following insertion, and it can take up to six months to see a decrease in bleeding. Copper IUDs are preferred by some as a non-hormonal birth control option, but they can increase the amount and duration of menstrual bleeding by approximately 50% and lead to worsening of menstrual cramps. More serious potential complications of both types of IUD include expulsion (3–5%) and perforation of the uterus (one in 1,000).

IUDs can also be used as emergency contraception for the prevention of pregnancy immediately following unprotected sex. Copper IUDs are considered the most effective form of emergency contraception, with only 0.1% of those with a copper IUD placed within 5 days of unprotected sex becoming pregnant. Hormonal IUDs are also an acceptable method for emergency contraception; however, there is less data regarding effectiveness.

Though concern exists among some whether an IUD is only a contraceptive, studies indicate that users discharged roughly the same number of decaying fertilized embryos (4.5%) as did non-users.

== History ==
The first IUD was developed in 1909 by the German physician Richard Richter of Waldenburg. Unlike modern intrauterine devices, early interuterine (from Latin inter-, meaning "between", as opposed to intra-) devices crossed both the vagina and the uterus, causing a high rate of pelvic inflammatory disease.

Ernst Gräfenberg, another German physician (after whom the G-spot is named), created the first Ring IUD, Gräfenberg's ring, made of silver filaments. His work was suppressed during the Nazi regime, when contraception was considered a threat to Aryan women. In 1935, Gräfenberg, who was Jewish, was in jail in Berlin and Margaret Sanger paid a ransom to have him released. He moved to the United States and opened a private practice in New York, New York. His colleagues H. Hall and M. Stone took up his work after his death and created the stainless steel Hall-Stone Ring.

Dr. Jack Lippes helped begin the increase of IUD use in the United States in the late 1950s. In this time, thermoplastics, which can bend for insertion and retain their original shape, became the material used for first-generation IUDs. Lippes also devised the addition of the nylon string to facilitate IUD removal. Lippes and his friend Paul Bronnenkant, a plastics developer, crafted the first Lippes Loop in Bronnenkant's kitchen, heating and molding the plastic on cookie sheets in the oven. His trapezoid-shaped Lippes Loop IUD became one of the most popular first-generation IUDs. In the following years, many different-shaped plastic IUDs were invented and marketed. One of these first-generation IUDs was the Dalkon Shield, whose poor design caused bacterial infection and led to thousands of lawsuits. Although it was removed from the market, the Dalkon Shield had a lasting, negative impact on IUD use and reputation in the United States.

The invention of the copper IUD in the 1960s introduced the capital T-shaped design used by most modern IUDs. U.S. physician Howard Tatum determined this shape would work better with the space of the uterine cavity. He predicted this would reduce rates of IUD expulsion. Further, Tatum and Chilean physician Jaime Zipper discovered that copper could be an effective spermicide and developed the first copper IUD. Improvements by Tatum led to the creation of the TCu380A (ParaGard), which is the preferred copper IUD since 1997.

The hormonal IUD was also invented in the 1960s and 1970s with the goal of mitigating the increased menstrual bleeding associated with copper and inert IUDs. The first model, Progestasert, lasted for one year of use and was quickly discontinued. The Mirena hormonal IUD was released in 1976.

=== China ===
In China, the use of IUDs by state health services was part of the government's efforts to limit birth rates. From 1980 to 2014, 324 million women were inserted with IUDs, in addition to the 107 million who had tubal ligation. Until the mid-1990s, the state-preferred IUD was a stainless steel ring, which had a higher rate of complications compared to other types of IUD. It gave rise to the idiom shànghuán (上环), meaning "insert a loop". Since then, IUDs include T and V shapes, the former being the most common and easiest to remove.

== Mechanism ==
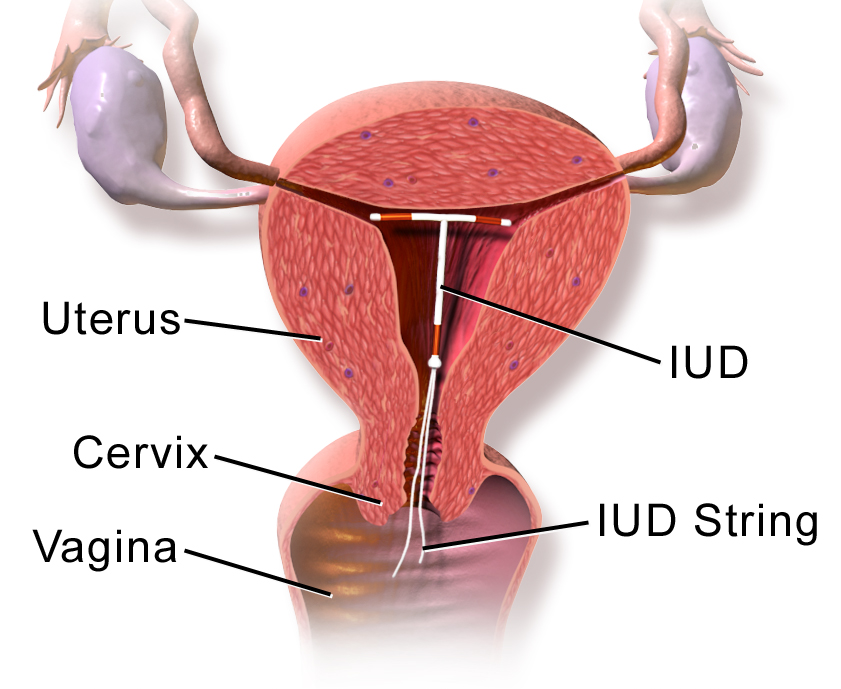
Illustration of intrauterine device

The main mechanisms of action of IUDs occur before fertilization, by preventing sperm from ever reaching the egg. The specific mechanism for preventing sperm from reaching the egg differs by type of IUD.

=== Hormonal ===
Hormonal IUDs (referred to as intrauterine systems in the UK) work by releasing a small amount of levonorgestrel, a progestin. The progestin released by hormonal IUDs primarily acts locally within the uterus, resulting in much lower systemic progestin levels than other progestogen only contraceptives. Each type of hormonal IUD varies in size, amount of levonorgestrel released, and duration of effectiveness. The predominant mechanism of action of progestin in the uterus is thickening the cervical mucus to prevent sperm from reaching the fallopian tubes and ultimately the egg. Hormonal IUDs can also thin the endometrial (uterine) lining and potentially impair implantation, but this is not their usual function. Because they thin the endometrial lining, hormonal IUDs often reduce or entirely stop menstrual bleeding. As a result, they are often used to treat menorrhagia (heavy menses), once pathologic causes of menorrhagia (such as uterine polyps) have been ruled out.

=== Non-hormonal ===
==== Copper ====
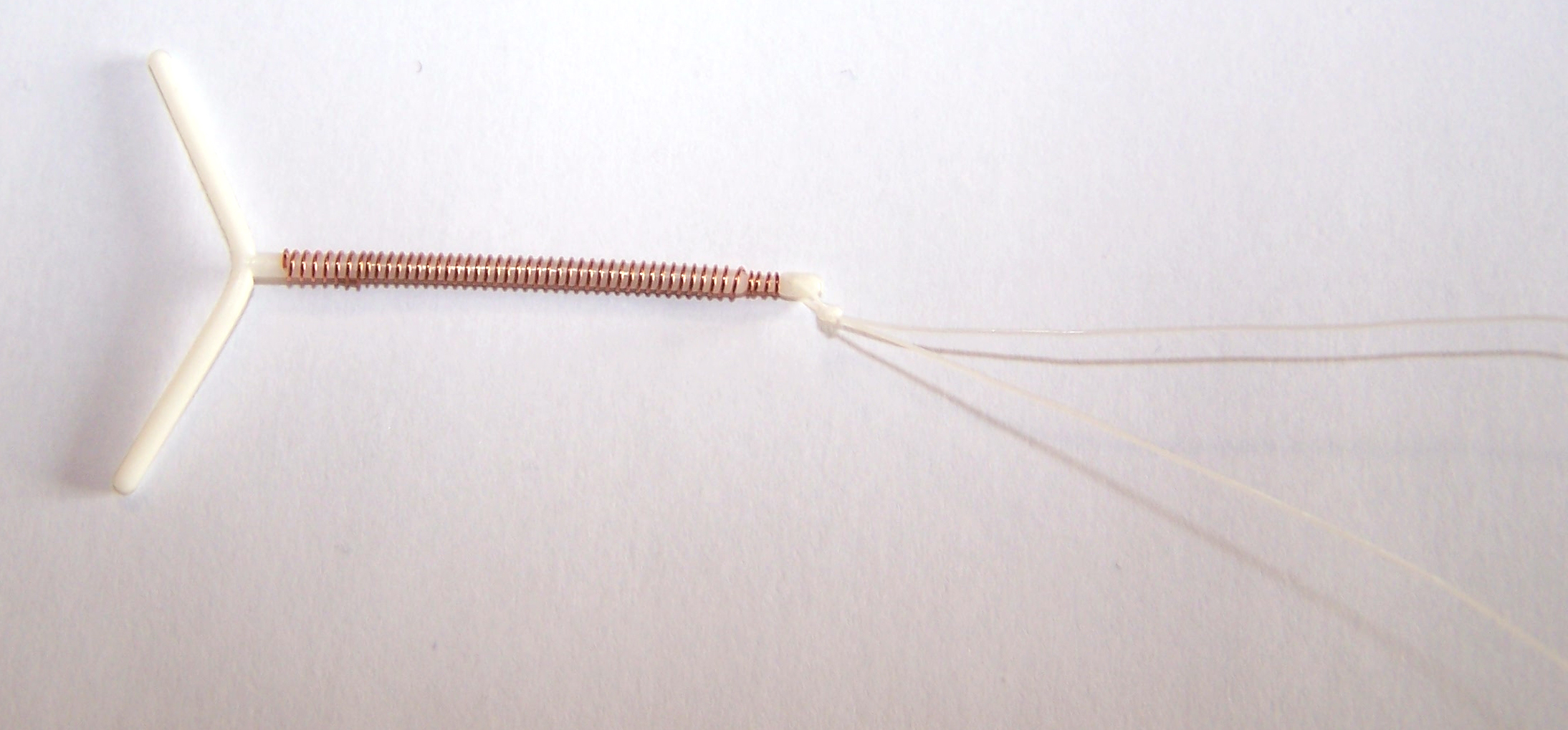
A copper T-shaped IUD with removal strings

Copper IUDs acts as a spermicide. Copper ions released from the IUD damage sperm and disrupt their ability to move, preventing sperm from traveling through the cervical mucus or destroying them as they pass through so that they never meet the egg. They also start a local inflammatory reaction that causes the uterus and fallopian tubes to produce a fluid that contains white blood cells, enzymes, and prostaglandins, which are toxic to sperm.

While not the main mechanism of action, studies have found that copper can also alter the endometrial (uterine) lining. This alteration can prevent implantation of a fertilized egg ("blastocyst"), but it cannot disrupt a fertilized egg that has already been implanted in the uterine lining.

==== Inert ====
Inert IUDs are not approved for use in the United States, the UK, or Canada. Inert IUDs do not have a bioactive component. They are made of inert materials such as stainless steel or plastic. Their primary mechanism of action is to cause a local foreign body reaction, which makes the uterine environment hostile to both sperm and implantation. They may have higher rates of preventing pregnancy after fertilization, instead of before fertilization, compared to copper or hormonal IUDs.

== Types ==
The types of intrauterine devices available and the names they go by differ by location. The WHO ATC labels both copper and hormonal devices as IUDs. In the United Kingdom, there are more than 10 different types of copper IUDs available. In the United Kingdom, the term IUD refers only to these copper devices. Hormonal intrauterine contraception is labeled with the term intrauterine system (IUS).

In the United States, there are two types available:

- Hormonal: Progestogen-releasing IUD (Mirena, Liletta, Kyleena, Skyla, and others)
- Nonhormonal: Copper-containing IUD (ParaGard and others)

| | Mirena | Liletta | Kyleena | Skyla | ParaGard |
|---|---|---|---|---|---|
| Hormone (total in device) | 52 mg levonorgestrel | 52 mg levonorgestrel | 19.5 mg levonorgestrel | 13.5 mg levonorgestrel | None |
| Initial amount released | 20 μg/day | 18.6 μg/day | 16 μg/day | 14 μg/day | None |
| Approved effectiveness for pregnancy prevention | 8 years | 8 years | 5 years | 3 years | 10 years |
| Predominant mechanism of action | Levonorgestrel thickens cervical mucus to prevent sperm from reaching the egg | | | | Copper ions are toxic to sperm |
| Advantages | Various hormone level options; Reduction in menstrual bleeding after 3 months; some users experience complete cessation of menstrual periods | | | | Non-hormonal option preferred by some; Most effective form of emergency contraception |
| Disadvantages | Ovarian cysts (although they can be asymptomatic); More invasive insertion procedure compared to other birth control options | | | | Heavier menstrual flow and cramps; More invasive insertion procedure compared to other birth control options |

=== Inert ===
In China, where IUDs are the most common form of contraception, copper IUD production replaced inert IUD production in 1993. However, as of 2008, the most common IUD used by immigrants presenting to Canadian clinics for removal of IUDs placed in China was still the stainless-steel ring (SSR). Because the SSR has no string for removal, it can present a challenge to healthcare providers unfamiliar with IUD types not available in their region.

== Insertion and removal ==
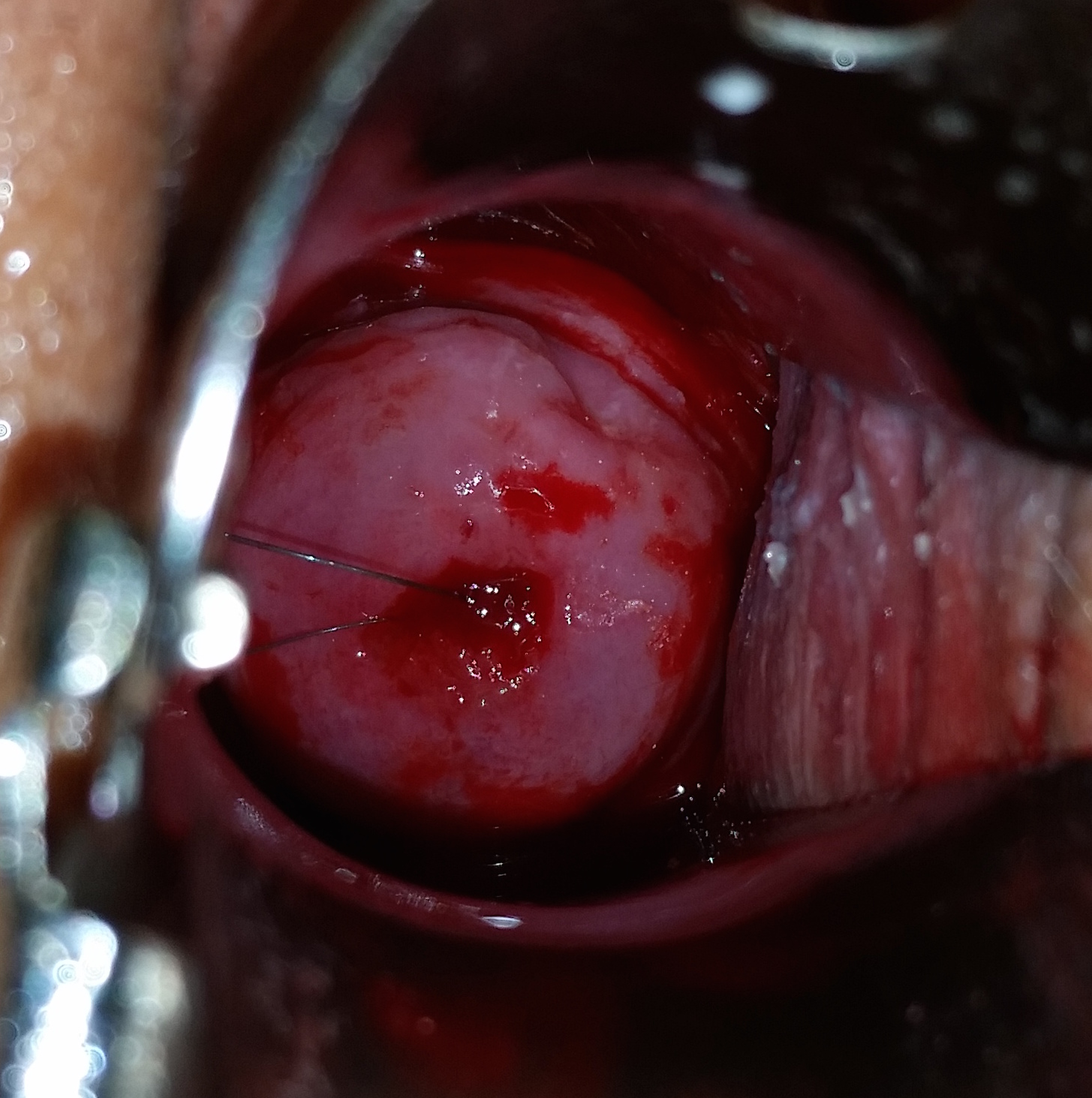
Removal strings of an intrauterine device exiting the cervical canal of a nulliparous woman. Image was taken immediately after insertion and injection of lidocaine.

IUD insertion can occur at multiple timepoints:

1. interval insertion, the most common, occurs in separation from any recent pregnancy;
2. post-abortion or post-miscarriage insertion, occurs following an abortion or miscarriage when the uterus is known to be empty;
3. postpartum insertion occurs after a woman gives birth (vaginal or cesarean delivery) either immediately, while the woman is still in the hospital, or delayed, up to 6 weeks following delivery. Insertion timing changes the risk of IUD expulsion.

=== Procedure ===
During the insertion procedure, the provider will first insert a speculum into the vagina to get a good view of the cervix (the opening to the uterus). The provider will then cleanse the cervix. Next, the provider will hold the cervix and provide a gentle outward pull with a tool called a tenaculum, which stabilizes the cervix and straightens out entrance of the uterus (which is typically curved at rest). This increases ease of insertion and helps with proper placement of the IUD. A suction cervical stabilizer can be used in place of the standard tenaculum, and they may reduce pain associated with the insertion procedure.

The next step of insertion is measurement of the depth of the uterine cavity with a thin uterine sounding (measuring) device. The provider will then set the measured uterine depth on the IUD insertion device to ensure proper placement. The IUD insertion device will then be inserted through the cervix into the uterus to place the IUD. The procedure itself, if uncomplicated, should take no more than five to ten minutes.

For immediate postpartum insertion, the IUD is inserted following delivery of the placenta. After vaginal deliveries, insertions can be done using placental forceps, a longer inserter specialized for postpartum insertions, or manually. After cesarean deliveries, the IUD is placed in the uterus with forceps or manually during surgery before suturing the uterine incision.

Generally, the removal is uncomplicated and reported to be not as painful as the insertion because no instrument is inserted through the cervix. For removal, the provider will find the cervix with a speculum and then use ring forceps to grasp the IUD strings in the vaginal cavity and then pull the IUD out.

Manufacturers and other training facilities can teach IUD placement and removal.

=== Pain and pain management ===
Most patients report mild to moderate pain during insertion, and a minority report severe pain. Clinicians tend to underestimate this pain. In a study of 200 insertions, patients rated their peak pain at a mean of 65 on a 100-point scale, while providers rated it at 35. Guidelines historically did not recommend routine pain relief, and patients sharing their experiences on social media in the 2020s increased scrutiny of the practice. In 2025 the American College of Obstetricians and Gynecologists (ACOG) acknowledged that many patients feel clinicians have dismissed their pain.

Options include NSAIDs, topical lidocaine, a paracervical block, nitrous oxide, inhaled methoxyflurane (the "green whistle"), and intravenous sedation or general anaesthesia where available. Sedation and general anaesthesia usually require a referral or separate appointment. Some clinics also offer virtual reality headsets for distraction.

Evidence for individual methods is mixed. A Cochrane review found that lidocaine gel and most NSAIDs did not reduce pain, while some lidocaine formulations, tramadol and naproxen helped in some groups. A 2026 meta-analysis found no significant effect of virtual reality on pain. Paracervical block is underused in the United States. The US CDC and ACOG recommend that clinicians discuss expected pain and pain relief options with every patient before insertion.

== Adverse effects ==
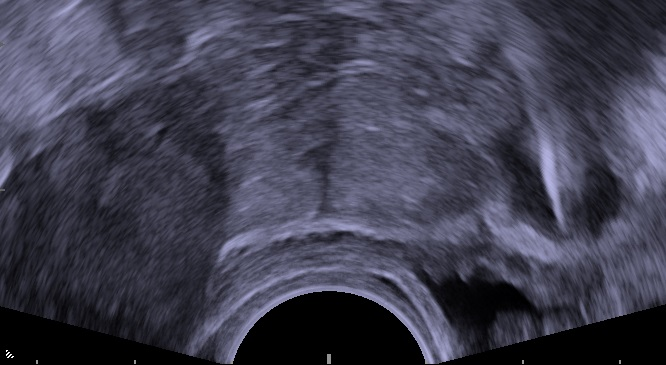
Transvaginal ultrasonography showing a perforated copper IUD as a hyperechoic (rendered as bright) line at right, 30 mm (1.2 in) away from the uterus at left. The IUD is surrounded by a hypoechoic (dark) foreign-body granuloma.

Regardless of the IUD type, some potential side effects are similar for all IUDs. Some of these side effects include bleeding pattern changes, expulsion, and pelvic inflammatory disease (especially in the first 21 days after insertion). The occurrence of IUD migration to another location outside of the uterus is rare, with reported rates in medical literature varying between 0.1% and 0.9%. However, when migration occurs, it can lead to serious complications such as uterine perforation and, in rare cases, bladder perforation. Bladder perforation, while uncommon (affecting only 2% of migrated IUDs), can result in symptoms like urinary frequency, hematuria, and stone formation, often necessitating surgical intervention for removal. Regular monitoring and imaging, such as ultrasound or CT scans, are recommended to detect such complications early and ensure timely treatment. A small probability of pregnancy remains after IUD insertion, and when it occurs, there is a greater risk of ectopic pregnancy.

Hormonal IUDs confer an increased risk of ovarian cysts. Mirena lists common (less than 1 in 10 women) side effects as including ovarian cysts, painful periods, increased vaginal discharge, headaches and depression. Hormonal IUDs have been associated with psychiatric symptoms, including depression, anxiety, and suicidal ideation, particularly in adolescents and young women, though evidence remains mixed. Some studies report increased depressive symptoms and anxiety, potentially linked to the sensitization of the hypothalamic-pituitary-adrenal (HPA) axis and elevated cortisol levels. Others find no association or even reduced symptoms.

Copper IUDs confer an increased risk of longer, heavier, and/or more painful menstrual periods.

== Other considerations ==
According to the U.S. Medical Eligibility Criteria for Contraceptive Use, published by the CDC, women and adolescents under the age of 20 and women who have not given birth are classified in category 2 for IUD use, mainly due to "the risk for expulsion from nulliparity and STIs from sexual behavior in younger age groups." According to the CDC, benefits generally outweigh the risks, and IUDs are recommended for young and nulliparous women, although more careful attention may be required. Women over age 20 and those who have previously given birth are placed in category 1, meaning no special concerns are placed on use.

Modern IUDs do not lead to infertility or make it harder for a woman to become pregnant, and fertility typically returns within days of removal. Some prior studies found an association between infertility and the Dalkon Shield, an early IUD design which is no longer available.

Modern IUDs do not increase infection. The earlier Dalkon Shield may have been problematic because it contained multifilament strings, which provided bacteria a space to grow and move up the string. IUDs manufactured after 2008 use monofilament strings to prevent this from happening. However, as with any medical procedure, IUDs can lead to increased risk of infection immediately after the insertion.

Menstrual cup companies recommend that women with IUDs who are considering using menstrual cups should consult with their gynecologists before use. There have been rare cases in which women using IUDs dislodged them when removing their menstrual cups, however, this can also happen with tampon use. Despite reports, as of 2023, there is no scientific agreement on whether using a menstrual cup increases the risk of IUD expulsion; more rigorous studies are needed.

Unlike condoms, the IUD does not protect against sexually transmitted infections.

== Prevalence and popularity ==
Globally, 14.3% of married or partnered women of reproductive age (15–49) use intrauterine contraception as their preferred method of family planning. A study found that female family planning providers choose LARC methods more often (41.7%) than the general public (12.1%). However, the adoption of IUDs varies significantly across different regions. In Asia, IUD is particularly popular, with 27% of contraceptive users relying on it, while in Oceania, the usage rate is much lower at 1.8%. Geographically, the majority of IUD users—over 80% worldwide—are concentrated in Asia, with nearly two-thirds (64%) of these users living in China, according to a 2011 United Nations review.

IUD use is more prevalent in less developed regions (15.1% of women) compared to more developed regions (9.2% of women). Within continents, there are significant variations. For instance, in Europe, IUD use ranges from 5% in Southern Europe to 16–28% in countries like France and Scandinavia. In Africa, IUD use is relatively low in sub-Saharan regions (less than 2%) but higher in Northern Africa, particularly in countries such as Egypt (36.1%) and Tunisia (27.8%). In the United States, the use of IUDs increased from 0.8% in 1995 to 7.2% from the period of 2006 to 2014 and to 10.5% in a 2017-2019 survey. IUD usage rates are also influenced by ethnicity within the United States, with Hispanic women more likely to use IUD compared to Caucasian women.

Among birth control methods, IUDs, along with other contraceptive implants, result in the greatest satisfaction among users.

== Cost ==
In the United States, intrauterine devices (IUDs) typically cost between $0 and $1,300, with prices covering medical exams, insertion, and follow-up visits. Under the Affordable Care Act, most insurance plans must cover all FDA-approved birth control methods, including IUDs. Coverage for specific brands may vary.
