= Gräfenberg's ring =

Flexible ring of silk suture

Gräfenberg's ring is a flexible ring of silk suture, later versions of which were wrapped in silver wire. It was an early IUD, a birth control device. Gräfenberg's ring was the first IUD used by a significant number of women. The ring was introduced by German gynecologist Ernst Gräfenberg in 1929. It ceased to be in wide use circa 1939.

Inserting a foreign device into the uterus causes an inflammatory response, which creates a hostile environment for sperm. The silver wire used to construct later versions of Gräfenberg's ring was contaminated with copper, which increases this spermicidal effect.

In 1934, Japanese physician Tenrei Ōta developed a variation of the Gräfenberg ring that contained a supportive structure in the center. The addition of this central disc lowered the IUD's expulsion rate. However, insertion of these devices caused high rates of infection and were condemned by the medical community. Furthermore, their use and development was stifled by World War II politics: contraception was forbidden in both Nazi Germany and Axis-allied Japan. The rest of the Western world did not learn of the work of Gräfenberg and Ota until well after the war ended.
