= Ernst Gräfenberg =

German-born physician and medical researcher (1881–1957)

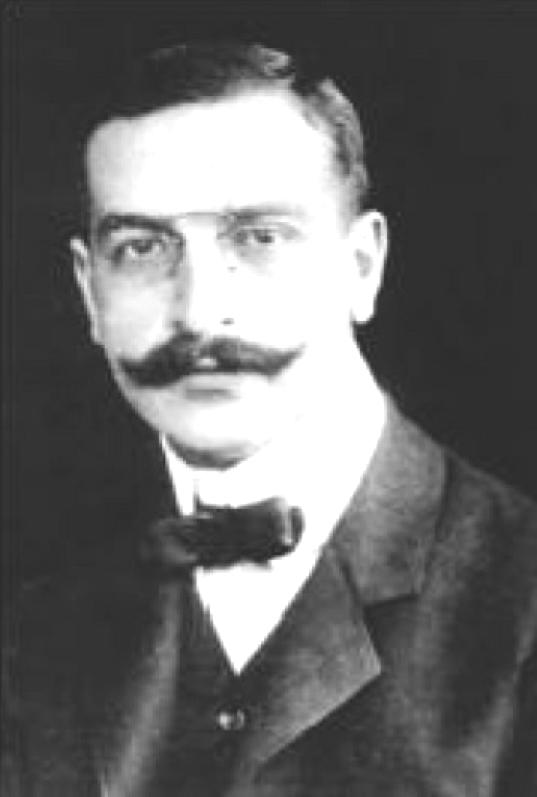
- Gräfenberg, c. 1920
- Born: 26 September 1881; Adelebsen, Province of Hanover, Kingdom of Prussia, German Empire
- Died: 28 October 1957 (aged 76); New York City, New York, U.S.
- Resting place: Ferncliff Cemetery, Hartsdale, New York, U.S.
- Education: University of Göttingen (MD, 1905); Ludwig-Maximilians-Universität München
- Known for: Gräfenberg ring; G-spot
- Spouse: Rosie Waldeck (m. 1921; div. 1924)
- Scientific career
- Fields: Gynecology, reproductive medicine, sexology
- Workplaces: University of Kiel

Ernst Gräfenberg (/ˈɡræfənˌbɜːrɡˌˈɡrɛf-/; German: [ˈɛʁnst ˈɡʁɛːfn̩bɛʁk]; 26 September 1881 – 28 October 1957) was a German-born physician and medical researcher. He developed the intrauterine device (IUD), and studied the role of the woman's urethra in orgasm. The G-spot is named after him.

== Life ==
Gräfenberg was born in Adelebsen near Göttingen, the son of Salomon Gräfenberg (1834–1918) and Minna Gräfenberg (née Eichenberg; 1845–1910). Ernst's father owned an iron wares business in Adelebsen and served as the head of the Jewish community there from 1868 to 1882, and as an Adelebsen community council member (Bürgervorsteher) from 1889 to 1893. In 1893 the family moved to Göttingen, where Ernst attended the municipal high school, or Gymnasium, later known as the Max-Planck-Gymnasium.

Gräfenberg was briefly married to writer Rosie Waldeck. He died largely unnoticed on 28 October 1957 in New York City, but the Jewish weekly Aufbau published an obituary. He was buried in Ferncliff Cemetery.

== Career ==
Gräfenberg studied medicine at the University of Göttingen and the Ludwig-Maximilians-Universität München, earning his doctorate on 10 March 1905. He began working as a doctor of ophthalmology at the University of Würzburg, but then moved to the Department of Obstetrics and Gynaecology at Kiel University, where he published papers on cancer metastasis (the "Gräfenberg theory") and the physiology of egg implantation. In 1910 Gräfenberg worked as a gynaecologist in Berlin, and by 1920 was quite successful, with an office on the Kurfürstendamm. He was the chief gynaecologist of a municipal hospital in Britz, a working-class Berlin district, and was beginning scientific studies of the physiology of human reproduction at the University of Berlin.

During the First World War, he was a medical officer and continued publishing papers, mostly on human female physiology. In 1929, he published his studies of the "Gräfenberg ring", the first IUD for which there are usage records.

17th-century, Dutch physician Regnier de Graaf described female ejaculation and referred to an erogenous zone in the vagina that he linked with the male prostate; this zone was later reported by Gräfenberg. The term "G-Spot" was coined by Frank Addiego et al. in 1981, named after Gräfenberg, even though Gräfenberg's 1940s research was dedicated to urethral stimulation. In 1950, Gräfenberg stated, "An erotic zone always could be demonstrated on the anterior wall of the vagina along the course of the urethra."

When Nazis assumed power in Germany, Gräfenberg, a Jew, was forced in 1933 to resign as head of the department of gynaecology and obstetrics in the Berlin-Britz municipal hospital. In 1934, Hans Lehfeldt attempted to persuade him to leave Nazi Germany; he refused, believing that since his practice included wives of high Nazi officials, he would be safe. He was wrong and was arrested in 1937 for having smuggled out a valuable stamp from Germany. On 9 November 1938, he was sentenced to three years imprisonment by the Landgericht Berlin and received a large fine for this alleged offense. Until 15 August 1940, he was imprisoned in the Brandenburg-Görden Prison. Margaret Sanger ransomed him from prison, whereupon he went to the U.S. and opened a practice in New York City. Among others, the German novelist Erich Maria Remarque helped Gräfenberg to build his new existence in the U.S.
