= Hormonal intrauterine device =

Intrauterine device

IUD with progestogen
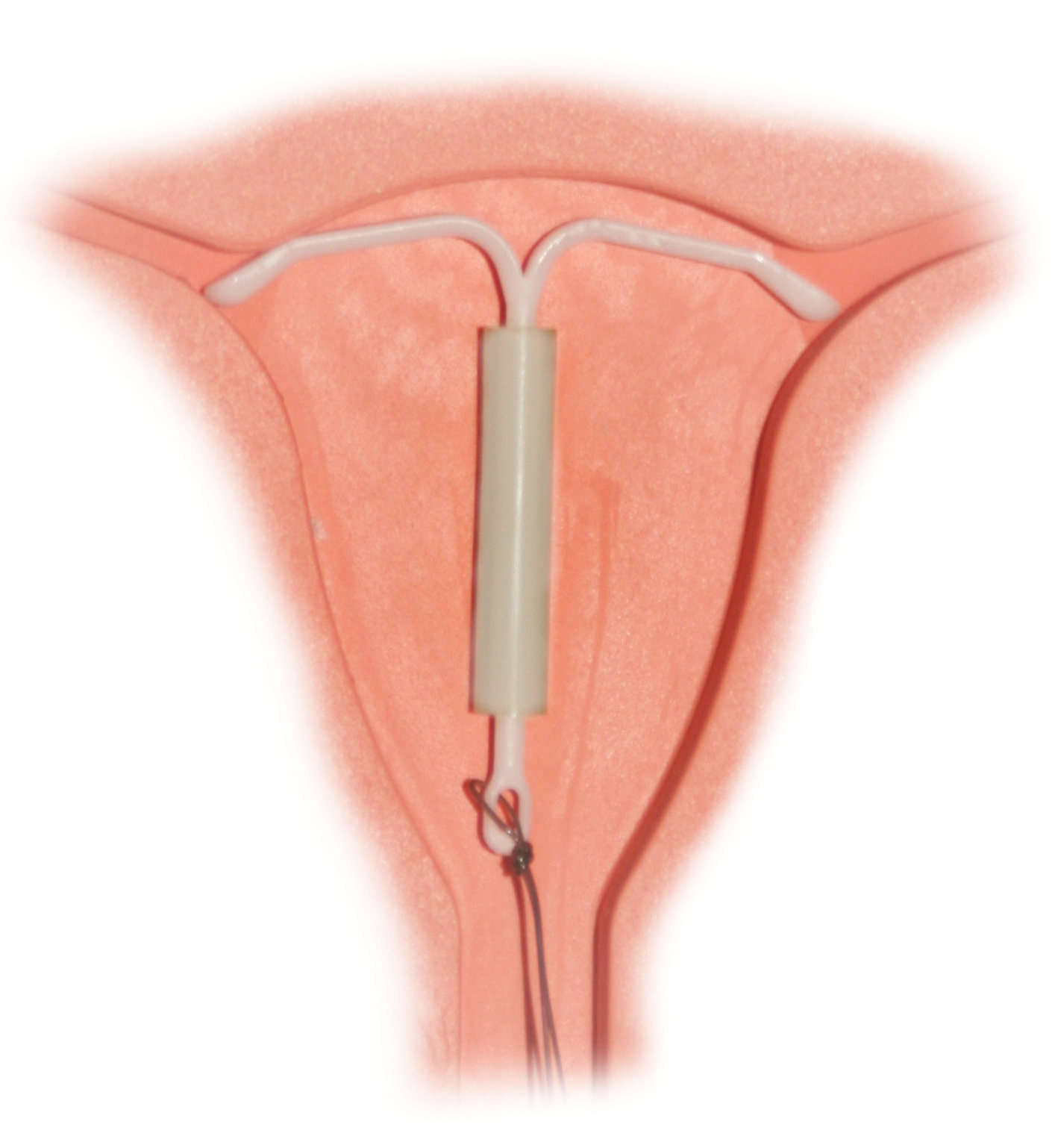
- Correctly inserted IUD

Background
- Type: Intrauterine
- First use: 1990 (Mirena—currently available); 1976 (Progestasert—discontinued in 2001)
- Synonyms: intrauterine system (IUS), levonorgestrel intrauterine system
- Trade names: Mirena, Skyla, Liletta, others
- AHFS/Drugs.com: Professional Drug Facts

Failure rates (first year)
- Perfect use: 0.1–0.2%
- Typical use: 0.1–0.2%

Usage
- Duration effect: 3–8 years
- Reversibility: 2–6 months
- User reminders: Check thread position monthly
- Clinic review: One month after insertion, then annually

Advantages and disadvantages
- STI protection: No
- Periods: Menstrual irregularity, periods usually lighter or none at all
- Weight: Potential side effect
- Benefits: No need to remember to take daily action
- Risks: Benign ovarian cysts, transient risk of PID, uterine perforation (rare)

A hormonal intrauterine device (IUD), also known as an intrauterine system (IUS) with progestogen and sold under the brand name Mirena among others, is an intrauterine device that releases a progestogenic hormonal agent such as levonorgestrel into the uterus. It is used for birth control, heavy menstrual periods, and to prevent excessive build of the lining of the uterus in those on estrogen replacement therapy. It is one of the most effective forms of birth control with a one-year failure rate around 0.2%. The device is placed in the uterus and lasts three to eight years. Fertility often returns quickly following removal.

Side effects include irregular periods, benign ovarian cysts, pelvic pain, and depression. Rarely uterine perforation may occur. Use is not recommended during pregnancy but is safe with breastfeeding. The IUD with progestogen is a type of long-acting reversible birth control. It works by thickening the mucus at the opening of the cervix, stopping the buildup of the lining of the uterus, and occasionally preventing ovulation.

The IUD with levonorgestrel was first approved for medical use in 1990 in Finland and in the United States in 2000. It is on the World Health Organization's List of Essential Medicines.

== Medical uses ==
Hormonal intrauterine device
Clinical data
- Pregnancy category: AU: B3
- ATC code: None

Legal status
- Legal status: AU: S4 (Prescription only); CA: ℞-only; US: ℞-only; In general: ℞ (Prescription only)

The hormonal IUD is an extremely effective method of birth control, and a 2021 study demonstrated that it may be used for emergency contraception. In addition to birth control, the hormonal IUD is used for prevention and treatment of:

- Heavy menstrual periods
- Endometriosis and chronic pelvic pain
- Adenomyosis and dysmenorrhea
- Anemia
- Endometrial hyperplasia (especially in pre-menopausal people who wish to maintain fertility in the treatment of endometrial hyperplasia)
- In some cases, use of a hormonal IUD may prevent a need for a hysterectomy.

Advantages:

- Considered one of the most effective forms of reversible birth control
- Can be used while breastfeeding (see also nursing mothers)
- No preparations needed before sex, though routine checking of the device strings by patient and physician is advised to ensure proper placement remains intact
- 90% of users who wish to become pregnant do so within 24 months of removal.
- May experience lighter periods (some users stop having periods completely, see also amenorrhea)
- Effective for up to three to eight years (depending on the IUD)

Disadvantages:

- Irregular periods and spotting between periods often occurs after insertion This usually improves after three to six months.
- Moderate to severe discomfort may be experienced during insertion procedure, including uterine cramping and back pain.
- Other potential adverse effects and risks

=== Effectiveness ===
After insertion, Mirena is effective at preventing pregnancy for up to eight years. Kyleena is approved for five years and Skyla is approved for three years.

The hormonal IUD is a long-acting reversible contraceptive, and is considered one of the most effective forms of birth control. The first year failure rate for the hormonal IUD is 0.1-0.2% and the five-year failure rate is 0.7-0.9%. These rates are comparable to tubal sterilization, but unlike sterilization the effects of the hormonal IUD are reversible.

The hormonal IUD is considered to be more effective than other common forms of reversible contraception, such as the birth control pill, because it requires little action by the user after insertion. The effectiveness of other forms of birth control is mitigated (decreased) by the users themselves. If medication regimens for contraception are not followed precisely, the method becomes less effective. IUDs require no daily, weekly, or monthly regimen, so their typical use failure rate is therefore the same as their perfect use failure rate.

In a 10-year study, the levonorgestrel IUD was found to be as effective as oral medicines (tranexamic acid, mefenamic acid, combined oestrogen–progestogen or progesterone alone) for heavy periods; the same proportion of study participants had not had surgery for heavy bleeding and had similar improvements in their quality of life.

In people with complete bicornuate uterus and in need of contraception, two IUDs are generally applied (one in each horn) due to lack of evidence of efficacy with only one IUD. Evidence is lacking regarding progestogen IUD usage for menorrhagia in bicornuate uterus, but a case report showed good effect with a single IUD for this purpose.

=== Breastfeeding ===
Progestogen-only contraceptives such as an IUD are not believed to affect milk supply or infant growth. However, a study in the Mirena application for FDA approval found a lower continuation of breastfeeding at 75 days in hormonal IUD users (44%) versus copper IUD users (79%).

When using Mirena, about 0.1% of the maternal dose of levonorgestrel can be transferred via milk to the nursed infant. A six-year study of breastfed infants whose mothers used a levonorgestrel-only method of birth control found the infants had increased risk of respiratory infections and eye infections, though a lower risk of neurological conditions, compared to infants whose mothers used a copper IUD. No longer-term studies have been performed to assess the long-term effects on infants of levonorgestrel in breast milk.

There are conflicting recommendations about use of Mirena while breastfeeding. The U.S. CDC does not recommend any hormonal method as a first choice of contraceptive for nursing mothers, although progestin-only methods, such as Mirena, may be used with close follow-up or when the benefits outweigh the risks. The World Health Organization recommends against immediate postpartum insertion, citing increased expulsion rates. It also reports concerns about potential effects on the infant's liver and brain development in the first six weeks postpartum. However, it recommends offering Mirena as a contraceptive option beginning at six weeks postpartum even to nursing women. Planned Parenthood offers Mirena as a contraceptive option for those who are breastfeeding beginning at four weeks postpartum.

== Contraindications ==
A hormonal IUD should not be used by people who:

- Are, or think they may be, pregnant
- Have abnormal vaginal bleeding that has not been explained (controversial)
- Have untreated cervical or uterine cancer
- Have, or may have, breast cancer
- Have abnormalities of the cervix or uterus (controversial)
- Have had pelvic inflammatory disease within the past three months
- Have had an STI such as chlamydia or gonorrhea within the past three months
- Have liver disease or tumor
- Have an allergy to levonorgestrel or any of the inactive ingredients included in the device

Insertion of an IUD is acceptable after a dilation and evacuation (D&E) abortion (second-trimester abortion), but may be associated with a higher expulsion rate. To reduce the risk of infection, insertion of an IUD is not recommended for women that have had a medical abortion but have not yet had an ultrasound to confirm that the abortion was complete, or that have not yet had their first menstruation following the medical abortion.

A full list of contraindications can be found in the WHO Medical Eligibility Criteria for Contraceptive Use and the CDC United States Medical Eligibility Criteria for Contraceptive Use.

== Side effects ==
- Irregular menstrual pattern: irregular bleeding and spotting is common in the first three to six months of use. After that time periods become shorter and lighter, and 20% of women stop having periods after one year of use. The average user reports 16 days of bleeding or spotting in the first month of use, but this diminishes to about four days at 12 months.
- Cramping and pain: many women feel discomfort or pain during and immediately after insertion. Some women may have cramping for the first 1–2 weeks after insertion.
- Expulsion: Sometimes the IUD can slip out of the uterus. This is termed expulsion. Around 5% of IUD users experience expulsion. If this happens a woman is not protected from pregnancy. Expulsion is more common in younger women, women who have not had children, and when an IUD is inserted immediately after childbirth or abortion.
- Perforation: Very rarely, the IUD can be pushed through the wall of the uterus during insertion. Risk of perforation is mostly determined by the skill of the practitioner performing the insertion. For experienced medical practitioners, the risk of perforation is one per 1,000 insertions or less. With postpartum insertions, perforation of the uterus is more likely to occur when uterine involution is incomplete; involution usually completes by 4–6 weeks postpartum. Special considerations apply to women who plan to breastfeed. If perforation does occur it can damage the internal organs, and in some cases surgery is needed to remove the IUD.
- Pregnancy complications: Although the risk of pregnancy with an IUD is very small, if one does occur there is an increased risk of serious problems. These include ectopic pregnancy, infection, miscarriage, and early labor and delivery. As many as half the pregnancies that occur in Mirena users may be ectopic. The incidence rate of ectopic pregnancies is approximately one per 1000 users per year. Immediate removal of the IUD is recommended in the case of pregnancy. No pattern of birth defects was found in the 35 babies for whom birth outcomes were available at the time of FDA approval.
- Infection: The insertion of the IUD does have a small risk of pelvic inflammatory disease (PID). Concurrent infection with gonorrhea or chlamydia at the time of insertion increases the risk of pelvic inflammatory disease. If PID does occur, it will most likely happen within 21 days of insertion. The device itself does not increase the risk of infection.
- Ovarian cysts: Enlarged follicles (ovarian cysts) have been diagnosed in about 12% of the subjects using a hormonal IUD in studies that use ultrasound to look for cysts, even if asymptomatic. In studies that only evaluate symptomatic cysts, only 4.5% of women complain of any ovarian cysts over 5 or more years of use, and only 0.3% require IUD removal for ovarian cysts. Thus, any issues with ovarian cysts are not of a clinically relevant nature. Most of these follicles are asymptomatic, although some may be accompanied by pelvic pain or dyspareunia. In most cases the enlarged follicles disappear spontaneously after two to three months. Surgical intervention is not usually required.
- Mental health changes including: nervousness, depressed mood, mood swings
- Weight gain
- Headache, migraine
- Nausea
- Acne
- Excessive hairiness
- Lower abdominal or back pain
- Decreased libido
- Itching, redness or swelling of the vagina
- Vaginal discharge
- Breast pain, tenderness
- Edema
- Abdominal distension
- Cervicitis
- Bacterial vaginosis
- May affect glucose tolerance
- May experience a change in vision or contact lens tolerance
- May deplete vitamin B1 which can affect energy, mood, and nervous system functioning
- A "lost coil" occurs when the thread cannot be felt by a woman on routine checking and is not seen on speculum examination. Various thread collector devices or simple forceps may then be used to try to grasp the device through the cervix. In the rare cases when this is unsuccessful, an ultrasound scan may be arranged to check the position of the coil and exclude its perforation through into the abdominal cavity or its unrecognised previous expulsion.

=== Cancer ===
According to a 1999 evaluation of the studies performed on progestin-only birth control by the International Agency for Research on Cancer, there is some evidence that progestin-only birth control reduces the risk of endometrial cancer. The IARC in 1999 concluded that there is no evidence progestin-only birth control increases the risk of any cancer, though the available studies were too small to be definitively conclusive.

Progesterone is a hormone in the endometrium that counteracts estrogen driven growth. Very low levels of progesterone will cause estrogen to act more, leading to endometrial hyperplasia and adenocarcinoma. These effects can be minimized if treated with progestin, but not in very many cases.

Estrogen and progesterone have an antagonistic relationship. Estrogen promotes the growing of endometrial lining, while progesterone limits it. In the case of endometrial cancer, progesterone can negatively regulate estrogen driven growth. Tumors formed are correlated with insufficient progesterone and excess estrogen. In patients with endometrial cancer who use progestin releasing IUDs concluded mixed results.

A 2020 meta-analysis by Livia Conz et al. estimated that users of levonorgestrel-releasing systems had an increased breast cancer risk in general (with an odds ratio of 1.16) and higher risk for those over age 50 (odds ratio 1.52), and suggested balancing this risk against the known benefits of long-term use. Researchers cautioned against causal interpretation from this study, citing confounding effects, methodological concerns and a 2020 meta-analysis of randomized controlled trials which showed no increased risk.

=== Bone density ===
No evidence has been identified to suggest Mirena affects bone mineral density (BMD). Two small studies, limited to studying BMD in the forearm, show no decrease in BMD. One of the studies showed at seven years of use, similar BMD at the midshaft of the ulna and at the distal radius as nonusers matched by age and BMI. In addition, BMD measurements were similar to the expected values for women in the same age group as the participants. The authors of the study said their results were predictable, since it is well established that the main factor responsible for bone loss in women is hypoestrogenism, and, in agreement with previous reports, they found estradiol levels in Mirena users to be normal.

== Composition and hormonal release ==
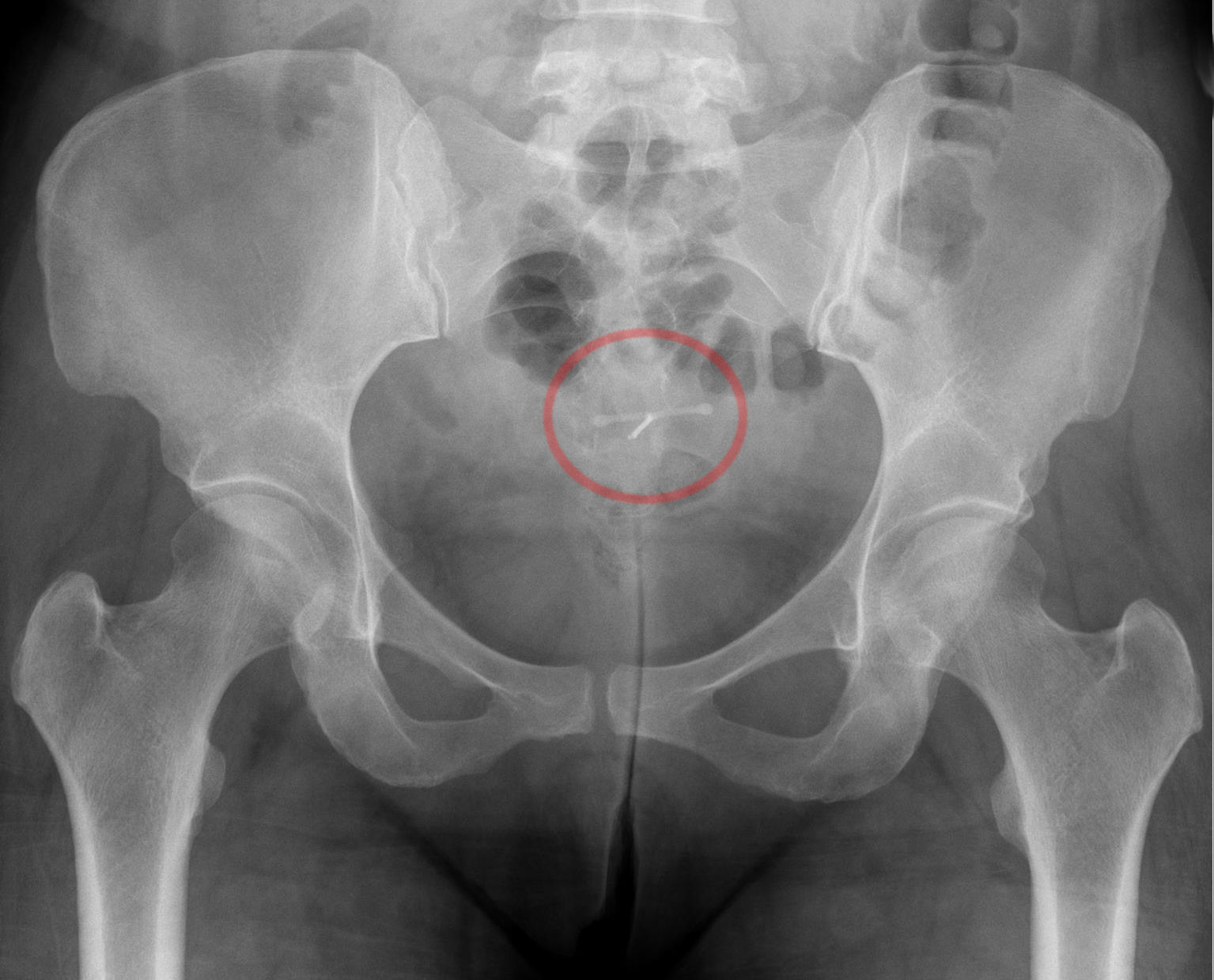
Mirena IUD visible on pelvic radiograph.

The hormonal IUD is a small T-shaped piece of plastic, which contains levonorgestrel, a type of progestin. The cylinder of the device is coated with a membrane that regulates the release of the drug. Bayer markets Skyla as Jaydess in the United Kingdom. Jaydess releases six micrograms per day and lasts for three years. In comparison, oral contraceptives can contain 150 micrograms of levonorgestrel. The hormonal IUD releases the levonorgestrel directly into the uterus, as such its effects are mostly paracrine rather than systemic. Most of the drug stays inside the uterus, and only a small amount is absorbed into the rest of the body.

== Insertion and removal ==
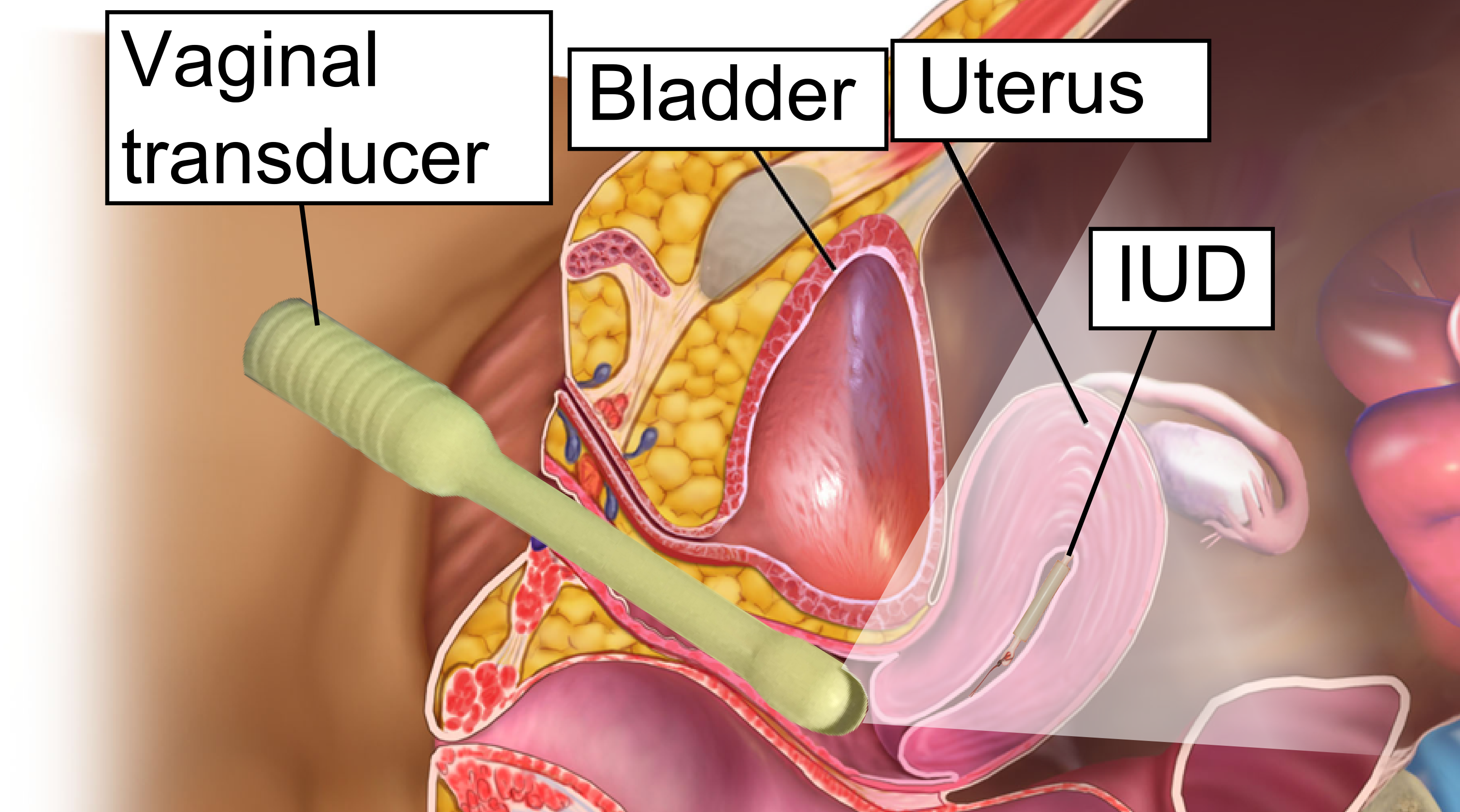
Schematic depiction of vaginal ultrasonography of a Mirena.

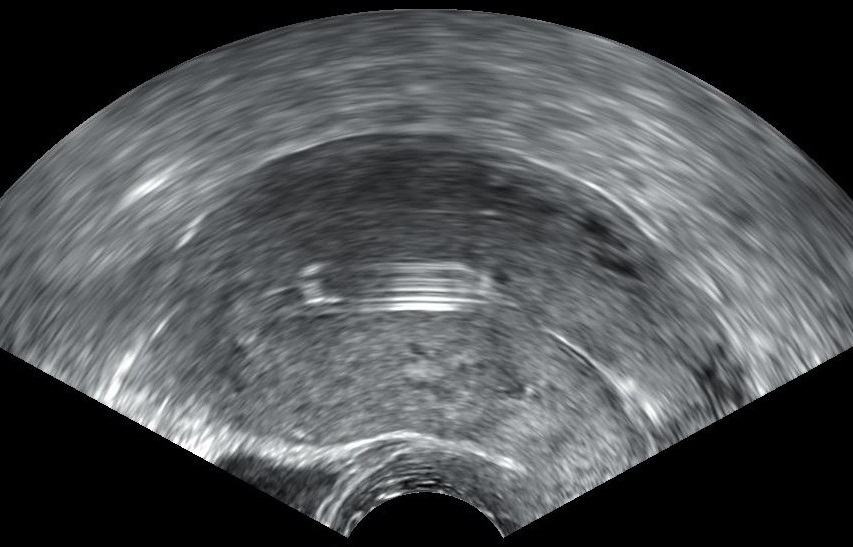
Vaginal ultrasonography showing a Mirena in optimal place in the uterus, as viewed from angle shown in schematic depiction.

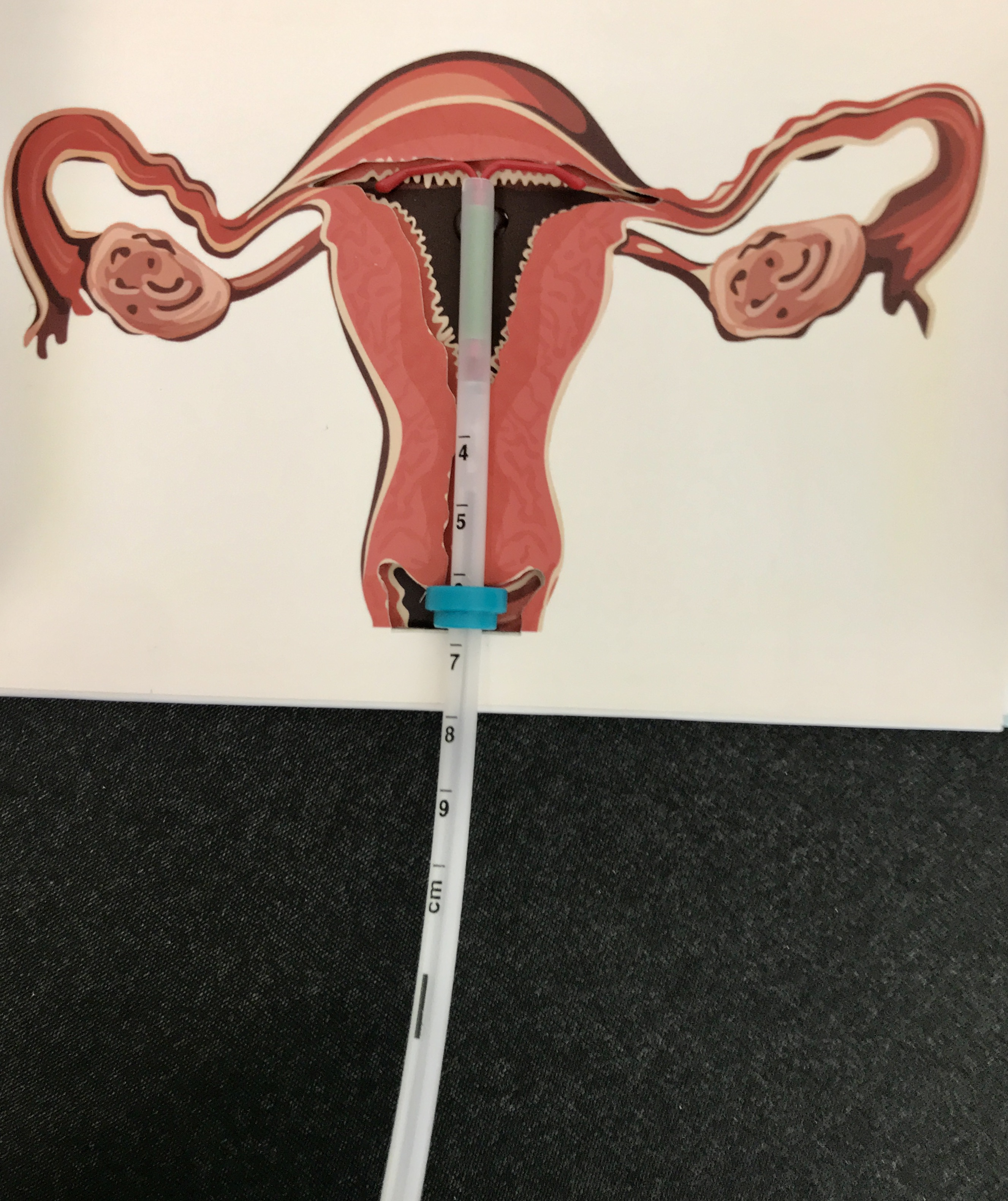
Insertion of a hormonal IUD

Removal of a hormonal IUD

The hormonal IUD is inserted in a similar procedure to the nonhormonal copper IUD, and can only be inserted by a qualified medical practitioner. Before insertion, a pelvic exam is performed to examine the shape and position of the uterus. A current STI at the time of insertion can increase the risk of pelvic infection. However, routine screening for gonorrhea and chlamydia prior to insertion is not recommended. If a person needs screening and there is no evidence of infection on examination or has been previously screened, insertion of the IUD does not need to be delayed.

=== Insertion ===
During the insertion, the vagina is held open with a speculum, the same device used during a pap smear. A grasping instrument is used to steady the cervix, the length of the uterus is measured for proper insertion with a uterine sound for decreasing chance of uterine perforation with the IUD, and the IUD is placed using a narrow tube through the opening of the cervix into the uterus. A short length of monofilament plastic/nylon string hangs down from the cervix into the vagina. The string allows physicians and patients to check to ensure the IUD is still in place and enables easy removal of the device. Moderate to severe cramping can occur during the procedure, which generally takes five minutes or less. Insertion can be performed immediately postpartum and post-abortion if no infection has occurred.

Misoprostol is not effective in reducing pain in IUD insertion.

=== Removal ===
Removal of the device should also be performed by a qualified medical practitioner. After removal, fertility will return to previous levels relatively quickly. One study found that the majority of participants returned to fertility within three months.

== Mechanisms of action ==
Levonorgestrel is a progestogen, i.e. a progesterone receptor agonist. The hormonal IUD's primary mechanism of action is to prevent fertilization. The levonorgestrel intrauterine system has several contraceptive effects, although thickening of the cervical mucus appears to be the primary effect. Other effects include making the inside of the uterus become fatal to sperm and thinning of the endometrial lining, but this is not the usual function.

Ovulation is not inhibited in all cases.

Numerous studies have demonstrated that IUDs primarily prevent fertilization, not implantation. In one experiment involving tubal flushing, fertilized eggs were found in half of women not using contraception, but no fertilized eggs were found in women using IUDs. IUDs also decrease the risk of ectopic pregnancy, which further implies that IUDs prevent fertilization.

== History ==
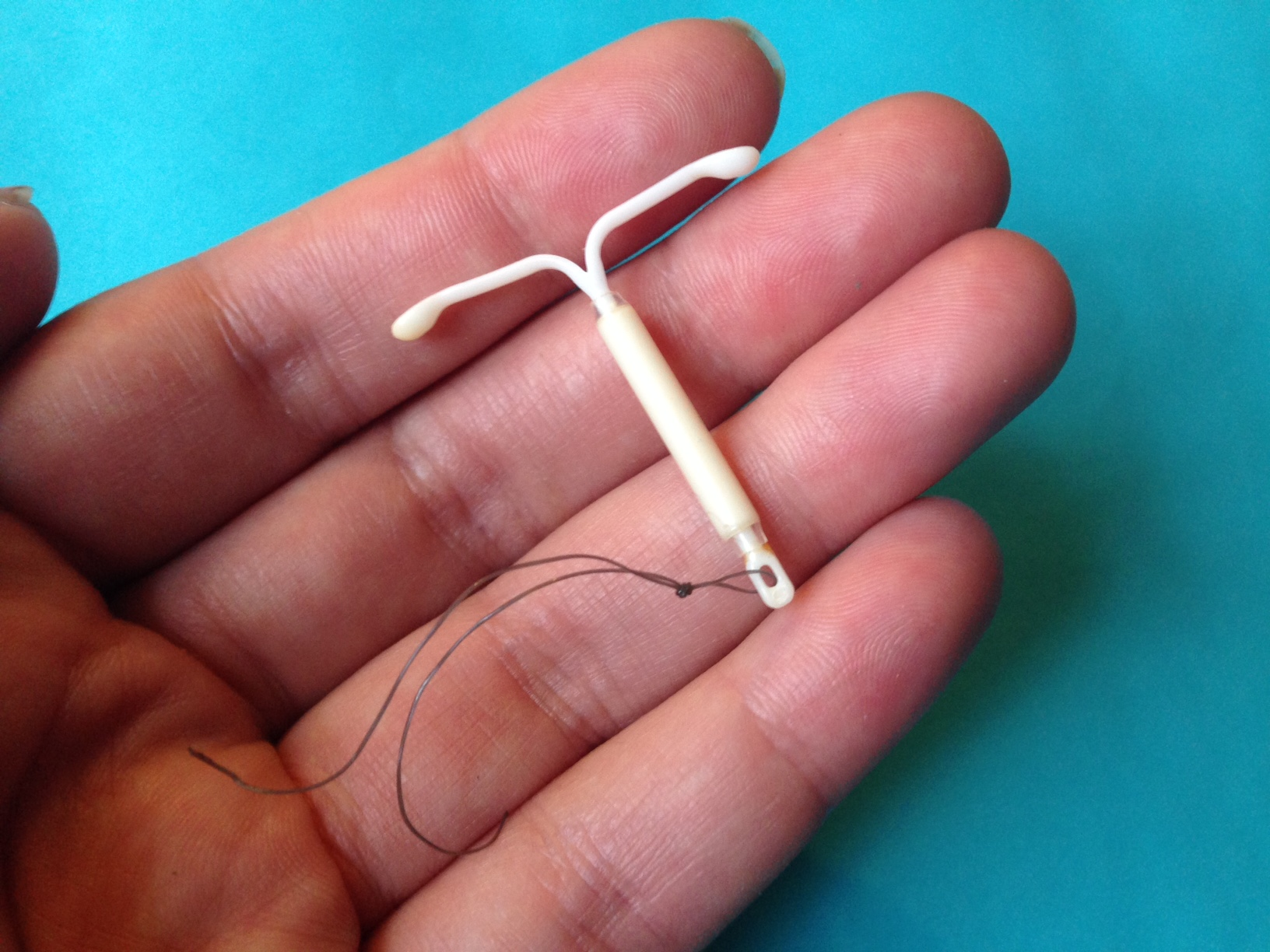
Close-up of a Mirena® intrauterine device

Hormonal IUDs were developed in the 1970s following the development of the copper IUD in the 1960s and 1970s. Dr. Antonio Scommenga, working at the Michael Reese Hospital in Chicago, discovered that administering progesterone inside the uterus could have contraceptive benefits. With knowledge of Scommegna's work, a Finnish doctor, Jouni Valter Tapani Luukkainen, created the T-shaped IUD that released progesterone, marketed as the Progestasert System in 1976. This IUD had a short, 1-year lifespan and never achieved widespread popularity. Following this relative lack of success, Dr. Luukkainen replaced the progesterone with the hormone levonorgestrel to be released over a five-year period, creating what is now Mirena.

The Mirena IUD was studied for safety and efficacy in two clinical trials in Finland and Sweden involving 1,169 women who were all between 18 and 35 years of age at the beginning of the trials. The trials included predominantly Caucasian women who had been previously pregnant with no history of ectopic pregnancy or pelvic inflammatory disease within the previous year. Over 70% of the participants had previously used IUDs.

In 2013 Skyla, a lower dose levonorgestrel IUD effective for up to three years, was approved by the FDA. Skyla has a different bleeding pattern than Mirena, with only 6% of women in clinical trials becoming amenorrheic (compared to approximately 20% with Mirena).

The city of Turku, Finland, is currently the only production site for the Mirena contraceptive family.

== Controversies ==
In 2009, Bayer, the maker of Mirena, was issued an FDA Warning Letter by the United States Food and Drug Administration for overstating the efficacy, minimizing the risks of use, and making "false or misleading presentations" about the device. From 2000 to 2013, the federal agency received over 70,072 complaints about the device and related adverse effects. As of April 2014, over 1,200 lawsuits have been filed in the United States.
