= Contraceptive patch =

Transdermal patch applied to prevent pregnancy

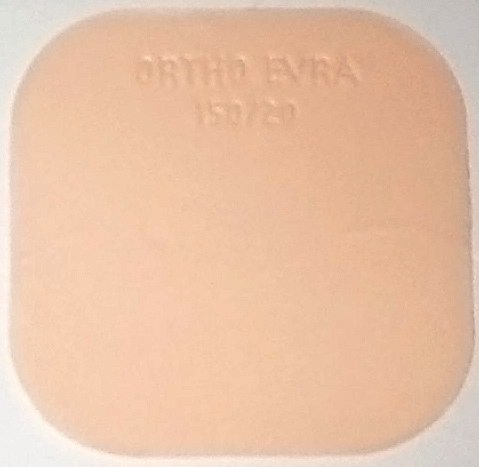
- Ortho Evra brand of contraceptive patch

Background
- Type: Hormonal (combined estrogen + progestin)
- First use: 2002

Failure rates (first year)
- Perfect use: 0.3%
- Typical use: 9%

Usage
- User reminders: Weekly application for 3 weeks
- Clinic review: 3-6 monthly

Advantages and disadvantages
- STI protection: No
- Weight: No proven effect
- Period advantages: Regulated, may be lighter and less painful
- Benefits: Compared to oral pills, may be less affected by antibiotics
- Risks: DVTs rates similar to oral combined pills

norelgestromin / ethinyl estradiol
Combination of
- Norelgestromin: Progestogen
- Ethinylestradiol: Estrogen

Clinical data
- Trade names: Ortho Evra, Xulane, Evra
- AHFS/Drugs.com: Professional Drug Facts
- MedlinePlus: a602006
- License data: EU EMA: by INN; US DailyMed: Norelgestromin_and_ethinyl_estradiol
- Pregnancy category: Contraindicated
- Routes of administration: Transdermal (patch)
- ATC code: G03AA13 (WHO)

Legal status
- Legal status: CA: ℞-only; UK: POM (Prescription only); US: ℞-only; In general: ℞ (Prescription only)

Identifiers
- CAS Number: 53016-31-2; 57-63-6
- PubChem CID: 91758695
- DrugBank: DB06713; DB00977
- ChemSpider: None
- UNII: R0TAY3X631; 423D2T571U
- KEGG: D10839

Chemical and physical data
- Formula: C_{41}H_{53}NO_{4}
- Molar mass: 623.878 g·mol^{−1}
- 3D model (JSmol): Interactive image
- SMILES: CCC12CCC3C(C1CCC2(C#C)O)CCC4=CC(=NO)CCC34.CC12CCC3C(C1CCC2(C#C)O)CCC4=C3C=CC(=C4)O
- InChI: InChI=1S/C21H29NO2.C20H24O2/c1-3-20-11-9-17-16-8-6-15(22-24)13-14(16)5-7-18(17)19(20)10-12-21(20,23)4-2;1-3-20(22)11-9-18-17-6-4-13-12-14(21)5-7-15(13)16(17)8-10-19(18,20)2/h2,13,16-19,23-24H,3,5-12H2,1H3;1,5,7,12,16-18,21-22H,4,6,8-11H2,2H3/b22-15-;/t16-,17+,18+,19-,20-,21-;16-,17-,18+,19+,20+/m01/s1; Key:KBFRRZPPJPKFHQ-WKXKRCMPSA-N

levonorgestrel / ethinyl estradiol
Combination of
- Levonorgestrel: Progestogen
- Ethinylestradiol: Estrogen

Clinical data
- Trade names: Twirla
- License data: US DailyMed: Twirla
- Pregnancy category: Contraindicated
- Routes of administration: Transdermal (patch)
- ATC code: G03AB03 (WHO)

Legal status
- Legal status: US: ℞-only

Identifiers
- ChemSpider: None

A contraceptive patch, also known as "the patch", is a transdermal patch applied to the skin that releases synthetic oestrogen and progestogen hormones to prevent pregnancy. They have been shown to be as effective as the combined oral contraceptive pill with perfect use, and the patch may be more effective in typical use.

Xulane and Twirla are approved for use in the United States. Evra is approved for use in Canada and marketed by Janssen Inc., and it is approved for use in the United Kingdom and in Europe and marketed by Janssen-Cilag. The patches are packaged in boxes of three and are only available by prescription.

== Medical uses ==
Because the patch works similarly to that of birth control pills, many of the benefits are the same. For example, the patch may make a woman's period lighter and more regular. It may also help to clear acne, decrease cramps, and reduce PMS symptoms. Additionally, the patch is associated with increased protection against iron deficiency anemia, ovarian cysts, pelvic inflammatory disease, and endometrial and ovarian cancer.

The patch is a simple and convenient form of birth control that requires weekly attention. When a woman stops using the patch, her ability to become pregnant returns quickly.

== Side effects ==
In three large clinical trials involving a total of 3,330 women using the Ortho Evra / Evra patch for up to one year, 12% of users discontinued the patch because of adverse effects. The most frequent adverse effects leading to patch discontinuation were: nausea and/or vomiting (2.4%), application site reaction (1.9%), breast discomfort, engorgement or pain (1.9%), headache (1.1%), and emotional lability (1.0%).

The most frequent adverse effects reported while using the Ortho Evra / Evra patch were: breast discomfort, engorgement or pain (22%), headache (21%), application site reaction (17%), nausea (17%), upper respiratory tract infection (10%), menstrual cramps (10%), and abdominal pain (9%).

Breakthrough bleeding and/or spotting while using the Ortho Evra / Evra patch was reported by: 18% in cycle 1, 12% in cycle 3, 8% in cycle 6 and cycle 13. Breakthrough bleeding (requiring more than one pad or tampon per day) was reported by: 4% in cycle 1, 3% in cycle 3 and cycle 6, and 1% in cycle 13.

Overall, side effects that tend to go away after two or three months include bleeding between periods, breast tenderness, and nausea and vomiting. Symptoms that may last longer include skin irritation around the area where the patch is placed and a change in the woman's sexual desires.

Additional side effect information is provided in the Ortho Evra label information and the Evra Summary of Product Characteristics (SPC) and PIL.

=== Interactions and contraindications ===
Contraceptive effectiveness of the patch or any other hormonal contraceptive may be reduced significantly if administered alongside various antibiotics, antifungals, anticonvulsants, or other drugs that increase metabolism of contraceptive steroids.

However, despite the interactions with many other antibiotics, a clinical pharmacokinetic drug interaction study showed that oral administration of tetracycline HCl 500 mg for three days prior to and seven days during use of Ortho Evra "did not reduce effectiveness of Ortho Evra." This is a significant factor in the common decision to administer tetracycline-derived antibiotics following an abortion (preventatively to fight potential infection) when synthetic hormone contraceptives are to be used afterwards.

Drugs containing St. John's wort are also known to affect the effectiveness of hormonal contraceptives.

It has also been found that the patch is less effective in women who weigh more than 198 pounds (90 kg).

The contraceptive patch and other combination hormonal contraceptives are contraindicated in women older than 35 years who smoke cigarettes.

The contraceptive patch is contra-indicated for use in women with a BMI ≥ 30 kg/m^{2}.

=== Thromboembolism ===
All combined hormonal birth control products have a very small increased risk of serious or fatal thromboembolic events. There has been ongoing research into the thromboembolic risks of Ortho Evra as compared to combined oral contraceptive pills. A recent study found that users of the contraceptive patch may have a twofold increased risk for non-fatal venous thromboembolic events compared with women who took a norgestimate-containing oral contraceptive with 35 μg of estrogen. However, a different study concluded that the risk of nonfatal venous thromboembolism for the contraceptive patch is similar to the risk for oral contraceptives containing 35 μg of ethinylestradiol and norgestimate. The contradiction in findings between the two studies has not been easily resolved, because the confidence intervals for the studies are overlapping.

In studies with oral contraceptives, the risk for cardiovascular disease (such as thromboembolism) is significantly increased in women over the age of 35 years who also smoke tobacco. Hence, Ortho Evra's package insert states: "Women who use hormonal contraceptives, including Ortho Evra, should be strongly advised not to smoke."

According to the manufacturer, the patches introduce a 60% higher level of estrogen into the bloodstream as compared to oral contraceptives; however, the clinical significance of this difference is unknown.

On November 10, 2005, Ortho McNeil, in conjunction with the FDA, revised the label for Ortho Evra, including a new bolded warning about higher exposure to estrogen for women using the weekly patch compared to taking a daily birth control pill containing 35 μg of estrogen, noting that higher levels of estrogen may put some women at increased risk for getting blood clots. The label was again revised in September 2006, and on January 18, 2008, the FDA again updated the label to reflect study results: "The FDA believes that Ortho Evra is a safe and effective method of contraception when used according to the labeling, which recommends that women with concerns or risk factors for serious blood clots talk with their health care provider about using Ortho Evra versus other contraceptive options."

== Method of use ==
The patch is first applied onto the upper outer arm, buttocks, abdomen or thigh on either the first day of the menstrual cycle (day 1) or on the first Sunday following that day, whichever is preferred. The day of application is known from that point as patch change day. Seven days later, when patch change day comes again, the user removes the patch and applies another to one of the approved locations on the body. This process is repeated again on the next patch change day. On the following patch change day, the patch is removed and not replaced. The user waits seven days without a patch in place, and on the next patch change day they apply a new patch. Extended use regimens, where patches are used for several weeks before a patch-free week, have been studied.

The patch should be applied to skin that is clean, dry, and intact. This means if skin is red, irritated, or cut, the patch should not be placed in that area. Additionally, avoid using lotions, powder, or makeup around the area where the patch is or will be placed.

=== Backup contraception ===
- If someone chooses to begin with their patch change day as day one of their menstrual cycle, the patch is able to take effect in time to prevent ovulation (see Mechanism of Action below) and no form of backup contraception is needed at all.
  - In the case that one wishes to begin using the contraceptive patch following a first trimester abortion or miscarriage, patch application can be done immediately afterwards. This can be considered the same as a day one start above, and no backup contraception is required.
- If a user chooses to begin with their patch change day as the first Sunday following day 1, it is necessary to use a backup form of contraception such as spermicide or condoms for the first week of patch wear.
- If the user is late placing her patch in the first week, or more than two days late placing the patch in the second and third weeks, they should apply the patch immediately, and then use a backup form of barrier protection for a week.

== Mechanism of action ==
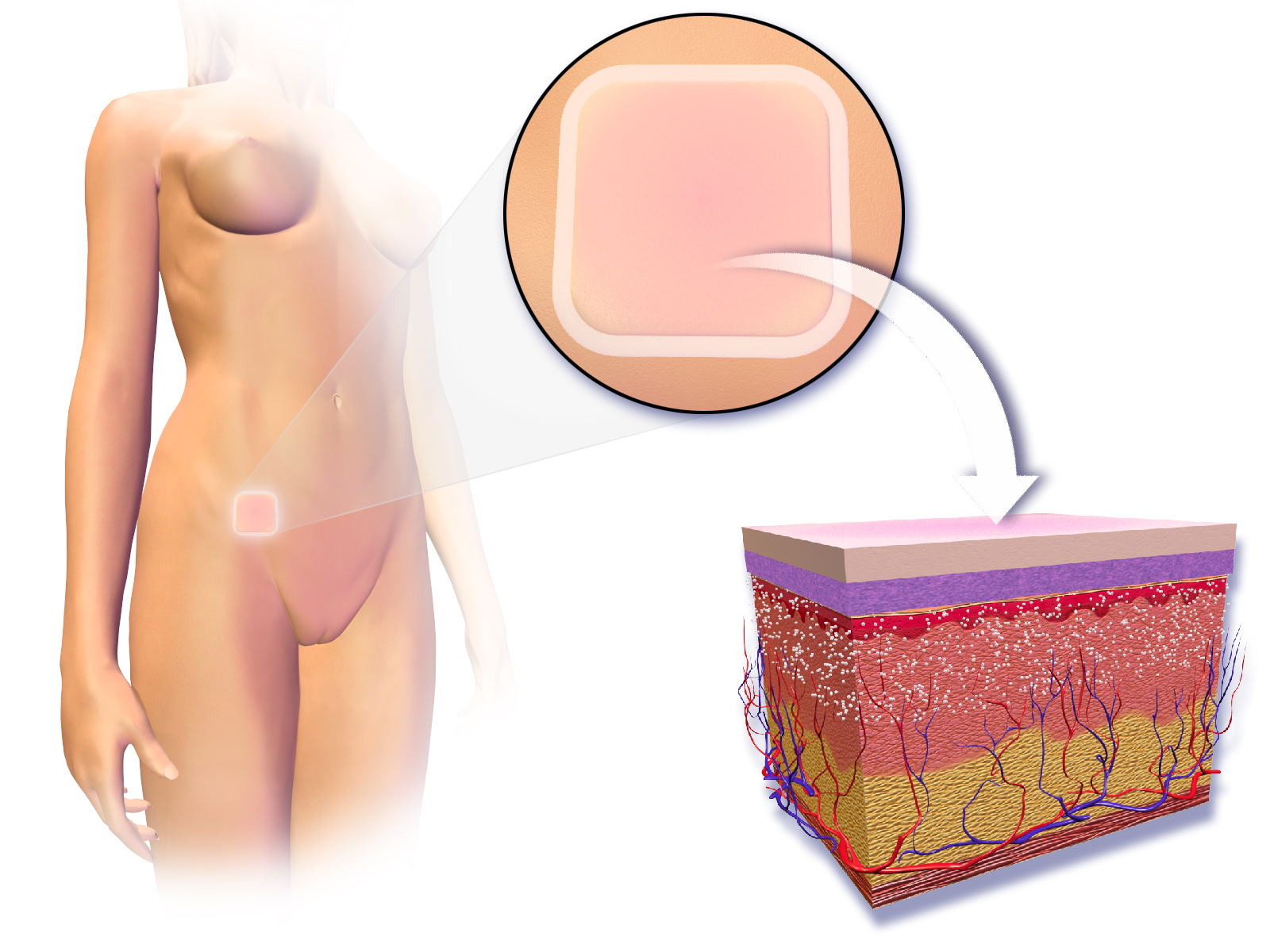
Illustration depicting transdermal contraceptive patch

Like all combined hormonal contraceptives, Ortho Evra / Evra works primarily by preventing ovulation. A secondary mechanism of action is inhibition of sperm penetration by changes in the cervical mucus. Hormonal contraceptives also have effects on the endometrium that theoretically could affect implantation; however, no scientific evidence indicates that prevention of implantation actually results from their use.

The 20 cm^{2} Ortho Evra contraceptive patch contains 750 μg ethinylestradiol (an estrogen) and 6000 μg norelgestromin (a progestin). The 20 cm^{2} Evra contraceptive patch contains 600 μg ethinylestradiol and 6000 μg norelgestromin. The Ortho Evra contraceptive patch and the Evra contraceptive patch are both intended to gradually release into the systemic circulation approximately 20 μg/day of ethinylestradiol and 150 μg/day of norelgestromin.

== Lawsuits ==
The patch has been associated with strokes and thrombosis and the mechanism for hormone absorption and dissipation from the body's tissues is different from "the pill". Several lawsuits have been instigated over these issues.

A lawsuit filed in Federal Court in New Jersey on September 2, 2005, by a Georgia woman who had a pulmonary embolism alleged the company promoted the patch despite knowledge of its health risks, for financial gain, while failing to warn of the risks of blood clots and other injuries.

In November, 2005, the parents of a 14-year-old girl from Wisconsin had filed a lawsuit against Johnson & Johnson because they claimed that she died from a blood clot that arose from her use of the patch.
