= C23H30O3 =

The molecular formula C_{23}H_{30}O_{3} (molar mass: 354.48 g/mol, exact mass: 354.2195 u) may refer to:

- Etretinate
- Melengestrol
- Levonorgestrel acetate (LNG-A)
- Prorenone
