= Norelgestromin/ethinylestradiol =

Pharmaceutical combination

Combination of
- Norelgestromin: Progestogen
- Ethinylestradiol: Estrogen

Clinical data
- Trade names: Ortho Evra, Xulane, Evra, others
- AHFS/Drugs.com: Professional Drug Facts
- MedlinePlus: a602006
- License data: US DailyMed: Norelgestromin and ethinyl estradiol
- Pregnancy category: Contraindicated
- Routes of administration: Transdermal (patch)
- ATC code: G03AA13 (WHO)

Legal status
- Legal status: CA: ℞-only; UK: POM (Prescription only); US: ℞-only; In general: ℞ (Prescription only)

Identifiers
- PubChem CID: 91758695
- ChemSpider: None
- KEGG: D10839

Chemical and physical data
- Formula: C_{41}H_{53}NO_{4}
- Molar mass: 623.878 g·mol^{−1}
- 3D model (JSmol): Interactive image
- SMILES: CCC12CCC3C(C1CCC2(C#C)O)CCC4=CC(=NO)CCC34.CC12CCC3C(C1CCC2(C#C)O)CCC4=C3C=CC(=C4)O
- InChI: InChI=1S/C21H29NO2.C20H24O2/c1-3-20-11-9-17-16-8-6-15(22-24)13-14(16)5-7-18(17)19(20)10-12-21(20,23)4-2;1-3-20(22)11-9-18-17-6-4-13-12-14(21)5-7-15(13)16(17)8-10-19(18,20)2/h2,13,16-19,23-24H,3,5-12H2,1H3;1,5,7,12,16-18,21-22H,4,6,8-11H2,2H3/b22-15-;/t16-,17+,18+,19-,20-,21-;16-,17-,18+,19+,20+/m01/s1; Key:KBFRRZPPJPKFHQ-WKXKRCMPSA-N

Norelgestromin/ethinylestradiol, sold under the brand name Ortho Evra among others, is a contraceptive patch containing the progestin norelgestromin and the estrogen ethinylestradiol.

The most common side effects include headache, nausea (feeling sick), breast tenderness, and irregular uterine bleeding.

Norelgestromin/ethinylestradiol is a transdermal patch (a patch that delivers a medicine across the skin). For the first three weeks of the menstrual cycle a new patch should be applied every week, followed by a fourth week, which is patch-free. The patch-free interval must not be longer than seven days; otherwise, additional non-hormonal contraceptive methods must be used, such as condoms. Transdermal patches must always be applied on the same day of the week to the buttock, abdomen (belly), upper arm or upper back. The same area of skin should not be used for two consecutive patches. Norelgestromin/ethinylestradiol may work less well in women weighing 198 pounds (90 kg) or more.

Norelgestromin/ethinylestradiol was approved for medical use in the United States in November 2001, and in the European Union in August 2002. It is available as a generic medication. In 2023, the combination was the 285th most commonly prescribed medication in the United States, with more than 600,000 prescriptions.

== Medical uses ==
In the United States, norelgestromin/ethinylestradiol is indicated for the prevention of pregnancy in women with a BMI < 30 kg/m^{2} for whom a transdermal delivery system is an appropriate method of contraception.

In the European Union, norelgestromin/ethinylestradiol is indicated for use as female contraception.

== See also ==
- Combined injectable contraceptive
- Contraceptive vaginal ring
- Oral contraceptive formulations
- List of combined sex-hormonal preparations
