= C21H29NO2 =

The molecular formula C_{21}H_{29}NO_{2} (molar mass: 327.46 g/mol, exact mass: 327.219829 u) may refer to:

- Butorphanol, an opioid analgesic
- Norelgestromin, a progestin medication
