= Yuzpe regimen =

Method of emergency contraception

The Yuzpe regimen is a method of emergency contraception that uses a combination of ethinyl estradiol and levonorgestrel, specifically 1 mg of norgestrel (or 0.50mg of levonorgestrel) and 100 mcg of ethinyl estradiol ASAP and again in 12 hrs. It is less effective and less commonly used than a larger dose of levonorgestrel alone, a dose of ulipristal acetate, or insertion of a copper intrauterine device. It is designed to be used within 72 hours of unprotected sexual intercourse because it works by inhibiting ovulation.

Typically, the Yuzpe regimen uses several doses of combined oral contraceptive pills. It may be preferred in locations where other forms of emergency contraception are unavailable or accessing emergency contraception carries a societal stigma. In these places, people often self-administer combined oral contraceptives as emergency contraception.

Subsequently, the World Health Organization (WHO) undertook an investigation into the use of progestogen-only tablets as an Emergency Hormonal Contraceptive (i.e. without any estrogen component). This showed greater efficacy with reduced side effects and has therefore superseded the Yuzpe method. A single dose of 100 mg mifepristone is also more effective than the Yuzpe regime.

== History ==
The method was first developed by Canadian Professor of Obstetrics and Gynecology A. Albert Yuzpe as a method of reducing potential unwanted pregnancies, including pregnancy from rape. He published the first studies demonstrating the method's safety and efficacy in 1974.
