= Gestodene =

Progestin medication

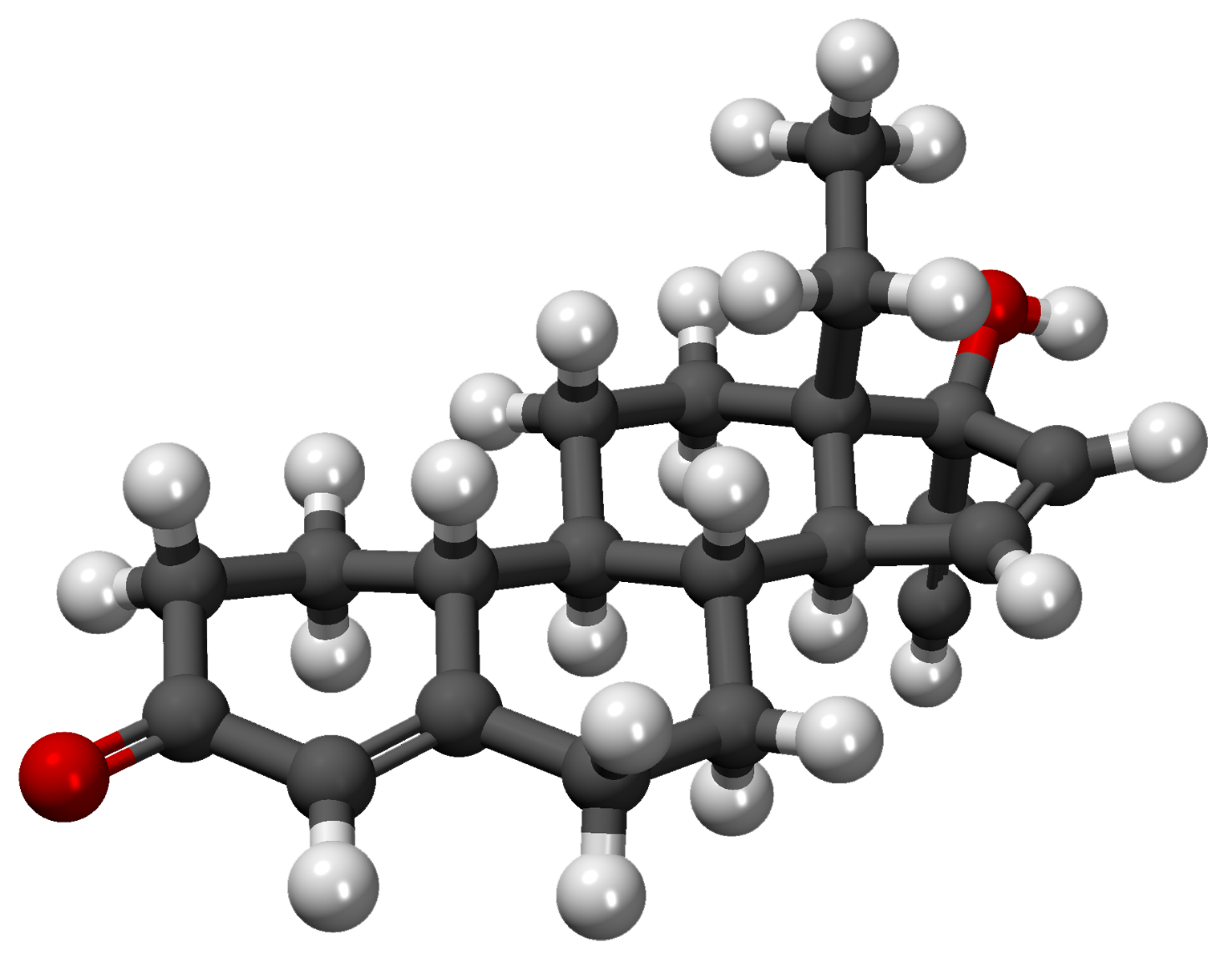

Clinical data
- Trade names: Femodene, Femodette, Gynera, Harmonet, Meliane, Minesse, Minulet, others
- Other names: GSD; SHB-331; δ^{15}-Norgestrel; 15-Dehydronorgestrel; 17-hydroxy-18a-homo-19-nor-17α-pregna-4,15-dien-20-yn-3-one; 17α-Ethynyl-18-methyl-19-nor-δ^{15}-testosterone; 17α-Ethynyl-18-methylestra-4,15-dien-17β-ol-3-one; 13β-Ethyl-18,19-dinor-17α-pregna-4,15-dien-20-yn-17β-ol-3-one
- AHFS/Drugs.com: International Drug Names
- Pregnancy category: X
- Routes of administration: By mouth
- Drug class: Progestogen; Progestin
- ATC code: G03AA10 (WHO) G03AB06 (WHO) (only combinations with estrogens)

Legal status
- Legal status: In general: ℞ (Prescription only)

Pharmacokinetic data
- Bioavailability: 96% (87–111%)
- Protein binding: 98% (64% to SHBG, 34% to albumin, 2% free)
- Metabolism: Liver (reduction, hydroxylation)
- Elimination half-life: 12–15 hours
- Excretion: Urine

Identifiers
- IUPAC name: (8R,9S,10R,13S,14S,17R)-13-ethyl-17-ethynyl-17-hydroxy-1,2,6,7,8,9,10,11,12,14-decahydrocyclopenta[a]phenanthren-3-one
- CAS Number: 60282-87-3
- PubChem CID: 3033968
- DrugBank: DB06730
- ChemSpider: 2298532
- UNII: 1664P6E6MI
- KEGG: D04316
- ChEBI: CHEBI:135323
- ChEMBL: ChEMBL1213583
- CompTox Dashboard (EPA): DTXSID6046478
- ECHA InfoCard: 100.056.478

Chemical and physical data
- Formula: C_{21}H_{26}O_{2}
- Molar mass: 310.437 g·mol^{−1}
- 3D model (JSmol): Interactive image
- Melting point: 197.9 °C (388.2 °F)
- SMILES: O=C4\C=C3/[C@@H]([C@H]2CC[C@]1([C@@H](/C=C\[C@]1(C#C)O)[C@@H]2CC3)CC)CC4
- InChI: InChI=1S/C21H26O2/c1-3-20-11-9-17-16-8-6-15(22)13-14(16)5-7-18(17)19(20)10-12-21(20,23)4-2/h2,10,12-13,16-19,23H,3,5-9,11H2,1H3/t16-,17+,18+,19-,20-,21-/m0/s1; Key:SIGSPDASOTUPFS-XUDSTZEESA-N

Gestodene, sold under the brand names Femodene and Minulet among others, is a progestin medication which is used in birth control pills for women. It is also used in menopausal hormone therapy. The medication is available almost exclusively in combination with an estrogen. It is taken by mouth.

Side effects of the combination of an estrogen and gestodene include menstrual irregularities, headaches, nausea, breast tenderness, mood changes, and others. Gestodene is a progestin, or a synthetic progestogen, and hence is an agonist of the progesterone receptor, the biological target of progestogens like progesterone. It has weak androgenic activity, weak antimineralocorticoid activity, and weak glucocorticoid activity.

Gestodene was discovered in 1975 and was introduced for medical use, specifically in birth control pills, in 1987. It was subsequently introduced for use in menopausal hormone therapy as well. Gestodene is sometimes referred to as a "third-generation" progestin. It is marketed in birth control pills widely throughout the world, whereas it is available for use in menopausal hormone therapy only a few countries. Gestodene is not approved in the United States.

== Medical uses ==
Gestodene is neutral in terms of androgenic activity, meaning that contraceptive pills containing gestodene do not exhibit the androgenic side effects (e.g., acne, hirsutism) sometimes associated with second-generation contraceptive pills such as those containing levonorgestrel.

The estrogen dosage in third-generation contraceptive pills (including those containing gestodene) is lower than that in second-generation oral contraceptives, reducing the likelihood of weight gain, breast tenderness, and migraine.

Third-generation oral contraceptives are also suitable for use in patients with diabetes or lipid disorders because they have minimal impact on blood glucose levels and the lipid profile.

Gestodene is also available in combination with estradiol for use in menopausal hormone therapy.

=== Available forms ===
Contraceptive products containing gestodene include:

- Melodene-15, Mirelle, and Minesse which contain 15 μg of ethinylestradiol and 60 μg of gestodene;
- Meliane, Sunya, Femodette, and Millinette 20/75 which contain 20 μg of ethinylestradiol and 75 μg of gestodene; and
- Gynera, Minulet, Femoden, Femodene, Katya and Millinette 30/75 which contain 30 μg of ethinylestradiol and 75 μg of gestodene.

== Side effects ==
Women who take oral contraceptives containing gestodene are 5.6 times as likely to develop venous thromboembolism than women who do not take any contraceptive pill, and 1.6 times as likely to develop venous thromboembolism compared to women taking oral contraceptives containing levonorgestrel.

== Pharmacology ==
=== Pharmacodynamics ===
Gestodene is a highly potent progestogen, and also possesses weak androgenic, antimineralocorticoid, and glucocorticoid activity. Due to its progestogenic activity, it has antigonadotropic and functional antiestrogenic effects. The medication has little or no estrogenic and no antiandrogenic activity.

Relative affinities (%) of gestodene
Compound	PR	AR	ER	GR	MR	SHBG	CBG
Gestodene	90–432	85	0	27–38	97–290	40	0
Notes: Values are percentages (%). Reference ligands (100%) were promegestone for the PR, metribolone for the AR, E2 for the ER, DEXA for the GR, aldosterone for the MR, DHT for SHBG, and cortisol for CBG. Sources:

==== Progestogenic activity ====
Gestodene is a progestogen, and hence is an agonist of the progesterone receptor. Based on the dosage necessary to inhibit ovulation in women, gestodene is the most potent of all of the currently used oral contraceptive progestogens. The oral dosage of gestodene required for ovulation inhibition is 30 or 40 μg per day. This is about 10,000 times lower than the oral dosage of progesterone required to inhibit ovulation (300 mg/day). A dosage of gestodene of 75 μg/day is used in contraceptives.

==== Androgenic activity ====
Gestodene has relatively high affinity for the androgen receptor (AR), with twice that of levonorgestrel (which is known to be one of the more androgenic 19-nortestosterone derivatives). However, the ratio of progestogenic to androgenic effects of gestodene is distinctly higher than that of levonorgestrel, and the increase in sex hormone-binding globulin (SHBG) levels (a marker of androgenicity) produced by oral contraceptives containing gestodene is slightly less than that produced by oral contraceptives containing desogestrel (which is known to be one of the more weakly androgenic 19-nortestosterone derivatives). In addition, no difference in acne incidence has been observed with oral contraceptives containing gestodene and oral contraceptives containing desogestrel. Gestodene may also act to some extent as a 5α-reductase inhibitor. Taken together, like desogestrel, gestodene appears to have a low potential for androgenic effects.

==== Glucocorticoid activity ====
Gestodene has relatively high affinity for the glucocorticoid receptor, about 27% of that of the corticosteroid dexamethasone. It has weak glucocorticoid activity.

Glucocorticoid activity of selected steroids in vitro
Steroid	Class	TR (↑)^{a}	GR (%)^{b}
Dexamethasone	Corticosteroid	++	100
Ethinylestradiol	Estrogen	–	0
Etonogestrel	Progestin	+	14
Gestodene	Progestin	+	27
Levonorgestrel	Progestin	–	1
Medroxyprogesterone acetate	Progestin	+	29
Norethisterone	Progestin	–	0
Norgestimate	Progestin	–	1
Progesterone	Progestogen	+	10
Footnotes: ^{a} = Thrombin receptor (TR) upregulation (↑) in vascular smooth muscle cells (VSMCs). ^{b} = RBA (%) for the glucocorticoid receptor (GR). Strength: – = No effect. + = Pronounced effect. ++ = Strong effect. Sources:

==== Antimineralocorticoid activity ====
Gestodene has very high affinity for the mineralocorticoid receptor (MR), but has only a relatively weak antimineralocorticoid effect that is comparable to that of progesterone.

==== Other activities ====
Although gestodene does not bind to the estrogen receptor itself, the drug may have some estrogenic activity, and this would appear to be mediated by its weakly estrogenic metabolites 3β,5α-tetrahydrogestodene and to a lesser extent 3α,5α-tetrahydrogestodene.

Gestodene binds to SHBG with relatively high affinity; it is 75% bound to the protein in circulation.

Gestodene shows some inhibition of cytochrome P450 enzymes in vitro, and has greater potency in this action compared to other progestins (IC_{50} = 5.0 μM). The medication also shows some inhibition of 5α-reductase in vitro (14.5% at 0.1 μM, 45.9% at 1.0 μM). Like with cytochrome P450 inhibition, gestodene was more potent in this action compared to other progestins, including desogestrel and levonorgestrel.

=== Pharmacokinetics ===
The oral bioavailability of gestodene has been found to range from 87 to 111%, with a mean of 96%. Unlike other third-generation progestins like desogestrel and norgestimate, gestodene is not a prodrug. Peak levels of gestodene occur within 1 to 4 hours after an oral dose, but usually within 1 to 2 hours. The plasma protein binding of gestodene is 98%. It is bound 64% to sex hormone-binding globulin and 34% to albumin, with 2% circulating freely. Gestodene is metabolized in the liver via reduction of the δ^{4}-3-keto group to form 3,5-tetrahydrogenated metabolites (major pathway) and via hydroxylation at the C1, C6, and C11 positions (substantial). In spite of differing from it only by the presence of an additional double bond between the C15 and C16 positions, gestodene is not metabolized into levonorgestrel in the body. The biological half-life of gestodene is 12 to 15 hours. Gestodene is eliminated 50% in urine and 33% in feces. Of gestodene excreted in urine, 25% is in the form of glucuronide conjugates, 35% is as sulfate conjugates, and 25% is unconjugated.

== Chemistry ==
Gestodene, also known as 17α-ethynyl-18-methyl-19-nor-δ^{15}-testosterone, as well as 17α-ethynyl-18-methylestra-4,15-dien-17β-ol-3-one or 13β-ethyl-18,19-dinor-17α-pregna-4,15-dien-20-yn-17β-ol-3-one, is a synthetic estrane steroid and a derivative of testosterone. It is more specifically a derivative of norethisterone (17α-ethynyl-19-nortestosterone) and is a member of the gonane (18-methylestrane) subgroup of the 19-nortestosterone family of progestins. Gestodene is almost identical to levonorgestrel in terms of chemical structure, differing only in having an additional double bond between the C15 and C16 positions, and for this reason is also known as δ^{15}-norgestrel or as 15-dehydronorgestrel.

=== Synthesis ===
A chemical synthesis of gestodene is reported that doesn't involve a microbiological fermentation step. Prior art:

The starting material is called 13-Ethylgon-4-ene-3,17-dione (13-Egedo) [21800-83-9] (1). Condensation with one equivalent of neopentyl glycol gives a mixture of products with the C=C occupying C5C6 (PC11462926) or C5C10 (PC11617672) positions (2). Treatment with Methyl phenyl sulfone [3112-85-4] in the presence of base leads to addition of the sulfinyl group (sulfoxide) to position 16 on the steroid (3). β-elimination upon reflux in the presence of triethylamine to give (4). Organometallic addition of ethynyllithium to the keto group gives (5). Hydrolysis of the ketal protecting group completed the synthesis of gestodene (6).

== History ==
Gestodene was first synthesized in 1975. It was introduced for medical use, specifically in combination with ethinylestradiol as a combined oral contraceptive, in 1987. The medication was introduced for use in menopausal hormone therapy in combination with estradiol in some countries such as in Europe and Latin America years later.

== Society and culture ==
=== Generic names ===
Gestodene is the generic name of the drug and its INN, USAN, BAN, and DCF. It is also known by its developmental code name SHB-331.

=== Brand names ===
Gestodene is marketed as a contraceptive in combination with ethinylestradiol under a variety of brand names including Femoden, Femodene, Femodette, Gynera, Harmonet, Lindynette, Logest, Meliane, Millinette, Minesse, Minulet, Mirelle, and Triadene as well as many others. It is marketed for use in menopausal hormone therapy in combination with estradiol under the brand names Avaden, Avadene, and Convaden.

=== Availability ===
Gestodene is marketed in the United Kingdom, Ireland, elsewhere throughout Europe, South Africa, Australia, Latin America, Asia, and elsewhere in the world. It is not listed as being marketed in the United States, Canada, New Zealand, Japan, South Korea, India, or certain other countries. Gestodene is marketed for use specifically in menopausal hormone therapy only in a few countries, including Colombia, Ecuador, Mexico, Peru, and Portugal.
