= Pregnancy from rape =

Pregnancy caused from the result of rape

Pregnancy is a potential result of rape. It has been studied in the context of war, particularly as a tool for genocide, as well as in other unrelated contexts, such as rape by a stranger, statutory rape, incest, and underage pregnancy. The scientific consensus is that rape is at least as likely to lead to pregnancy as consensual sexual intercourse, with some studies suggesting rape may actually result in higher rates of pregnancy than consensual intercourse.

Rape can cause difficulties during and after pregnancy, with potential negative consequences for both the victim and a resulting child. Medical treatment following a rape includes testing for, preventing, and managing pregnancy. A woman who becomes pregnant after a rape may face a decision about whether to have an abortion, to raise the child, or to make an adoption plan. In some countries where abortion is illegal after rape and incest, over 90% of pregnancies in girls age 15 and under are due to rape by family members.

The false belief that pregnancy can almost never result from rape was widespread for centuries. In Europe, from medieval times well into the 18th century, a man could use a woman's pregnancy as a legal defense to "prove" that he could not have raped her. A woman's pregnancy was thought to mean that she had enjoyed the sex and, therefore, consented to it. In recent decades, some anti-abortion organizations and politicians (such as Todd Akin) who oppose legal abortion in cases of rape have advanced claims that pregnancy very rarely arises from rape, and that the practical relevance of such exceptions to abortion law is therefore limited or non-existent.

== Rape-pregnancy incidence ==
Estimates of the numbers of pregnancies from rape vary widely. Recent estimates suggest that rape conception happens between 25,000 and 32,000 times each year in the U.S. In a 1996 three-year longitudinal study of more than 4,000 American women, physician Melisa Holmes estimated from data from her study that forced sexual intercourse causes over 32,000 pregnancies in the United States each year. Physician Felicia H. Stewart and economist James Trussell estimated that the 333,000 assaults and rapes reported in the US in 1998 caused about 25,000 pregnancies, and up to 22,000 of those pregnancies could have been prevented by prompt medical treatment, such as emergency contraception. Other analyses indicate a much lower rate. The Rape, Abuse and Incest National Network, a charity based in Washington, D.C., reached a much lower figure calculated using estimates from the Justice Department's 2005 National Crime Victimization Survey. The network took that survey's annual average of 64,080 rapes committed in 2004 and 2005 and applies the 5 percent pregnancy rate to reach an estimate of 3,204 pregnancies a year from rape.

=== Rate ===
A 1996 study of 44 cases of rape-related pregnancy estimated that in the United States, the pregnancy rate is 5.0% per rape among victims of reproductive age (aged 12 to 45). A 1987 study also found a 5% pregnancy rate from rape among 18- to 24-year-old college students in the US. A 2005 study placed the rape-related pregnancy rate at around 3–5%.

A study of Ethiopian adolescents who reported being raped found that 17% subsequently became pregnant, and rape crisis centres in Mexico reported the figure the rate of pregnancy from rape at 15–18%. Estimates of rape-related pregnancy rates may be inaccurate since the crime is under-reported, resulting in some pregnancies from rape not being recorded as such, or alternately, social pressure may mean some rapes are not reported if no pregnancy results.

Most studies suggest that conception rates are independent of whether insemination is due to rape or consensual sex.

Some analysts have suggested that the rate of conception may be higher from insemination due to rape. Psychologist Robert L. Smith states that some studies have reported "unusually high rates of conception following rape". He cites a paper by C.A. Fox and Beatrice Fox, reporting that biologist Alan Sterling Parkes had speculated in personal correspondence that "there is a high conception rate in rape, where hormonal release, due to fear or anger, could produce reflex ovulation". Smith also cites veterinary scientist Wolfgang Jöchle, who "proposed that rape may induce ovulation in human females". Literary scholar Jonathan Gottschall and economist Tiffani Gottschall argued in a 2003 Human Nature article that previous studies of rape-pregnancy statistics were not directly comparable to pregnancy rates from consensual intercourse, because the comparisons were largely uncorrected for such factors as the use of contraception. Adjusting for these factors, they estimated that rapes are about twice as likely to result in pregnancies (7.98%) as "consensual, unprotected penile-vaginal intercourse" (2–4%). They discuss a variety of possible explanations and advance the hypothesis that rapists tend to target victims with biological "cues of high fecundity" or subtle indications of ovulation.

In contrast, psychologists Tara Chavanne and Gordon Gallup Jr., found that women in the ovulatory phase of their menstrual cycle reduce risk-taking behaviors, which could theoretically reduce the likelihood of rape during fertile periods. Anthropologist Daniel Fessler disputed these findings, saying, "analysis of conception rates reveals that the probability of conception following rape does not differ from that following consensual coitus".

=== Sociobiological theories of rape pregnancy ===
Sociobiologists and evolutionary psychologists, a field often disputed and considered pseudoscientific in itself, have hypothesized that causing pregnancy by rape may be a mating strategy in humans, as a way for males to ensure the survival of their genes by passing them on to future generations. Randy Thornhill and Craig T. Palmer are key popularizers of this hypothesis. They assert that most rape victims are women of childbearing age and that many cultures treat rape as a crime against the victim's husband. Rape-pregnancy rates are crucial in evaluating these theories, because a high or low pregnancy rate from rape would determine whether such adaptations are favored or disfavored by natural selection.

=== Statutory rape, incest and underage pregnancy ===
In 1995–1996, the journal Family Planning Perspectives published a study by the Guttmacher Institute, a sexual health research and policy organization, on statutory rape (sexual intercourse with a minor) and resulting pregnancies. It drew on other research to conclude that "at least half of all babies born to minor women are fathered by adult men", and that "although relatively small proportions of 13–14-year-olds have had intercourse, those who become sexually active at an early age are especially likely to have experienced coercive sex: Seventy-four percent of women who had intercourse before age 14 and 60% of those who had sex before age 15 report having had a forced sexual experience". Because of difficulties in bringing such cases to trial, however, "data from the period 1975–1978 ... indicate that, on average, only 413 men were arrested annually for statutory rape in California, even though 50,000 pregnancies occurred among underage women in 1976 alone". In that state, it was found that two thirds of babies born to school-age mothers were fathered by adult men.

Sexual abuse early in life can lead young women to feel a lack of control over their sexual lives, decrease their future likelihood of using contraceptives such as condoms, and increase their chances of becoming pregnant or acquiring sexually transmitted infections. A 2007 paper by Child Trends examined studies from 2000 to 2006 to identify links between sexual abuse and teenage pregnancy, starting with Blinn-Pike et al.'s 2002 metastudy of 15 studies since 1989. It found that childhood sexual abuse has a "significant association" with adolescent pregnancy. Direct connections have been demonstrated both by retrospective studies examining antecedents to reported pregnancies and prospective studies, which track the lives of sex abuse victims and "can be helpful for determining causality". The more severe forms of abuse, such as rape and incest, entail a greater risk of adolescent pregnancy. Although some researchers suggest that pregnancy could be a choice made to escape a "bad situation", it may also be "a direct result of unwanted intercourse", which one study found to be the case for about 13% of participants in a Texas parenting program.

In Nicaragua, between 2000 and 2010, around 172,500 births were recorded for girls under 14, representing around 13% of the 10.3 million births during that period. These were attributed to poverty, laws forbidding abortion for rape and incest, lack of access to justice, and beliefs held in the culture and legal system. A 1992 study in Peru found that 90% of babies delivered to mothers aged 12–16 were conceived through rape, typically by a father, stepfather, or other close relative. In 1991 in Costa Rica, the figure was similar, with 95% of adolescent mothers under 15 having become pregnant through rape.

Many of the youngest documented birth mothers in history experienced precocious puberty and were impregnated as a result of rape, including incest. The youngest, Peruvian Lina Medina, was impregnated when she was four and had a live birth in 1939, at age five.

== Rape in war and conflict ==
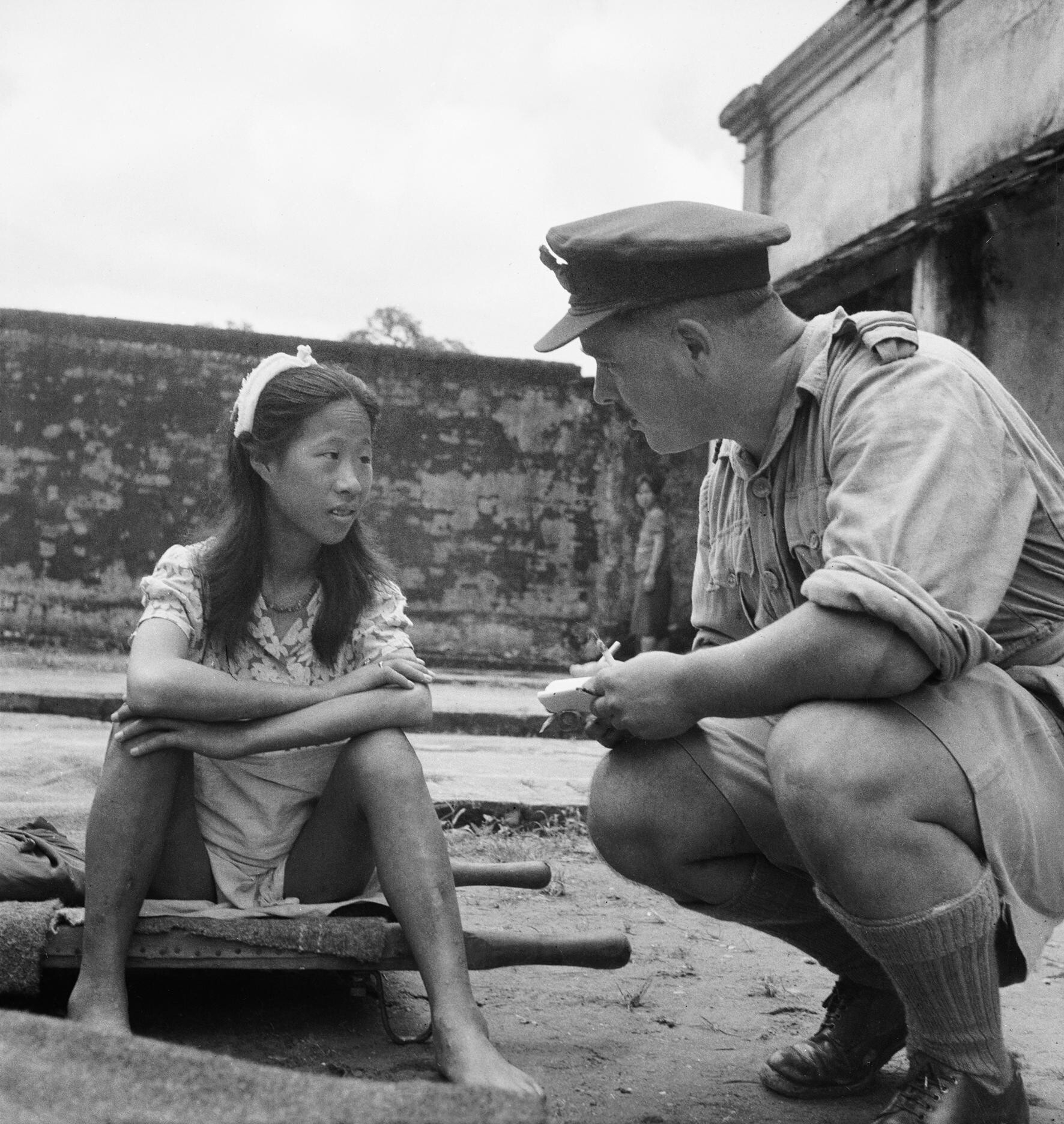
Forced prostitution was used by the Japanese Army during World War II. Rangoon, Burma. 8 August 1945. A young ethnic Chinese woman from one of the Imperial Japanese Army's "comfort battalions" is interviewed by an Allied officer.

Rape has been used as a weapon of psychological warfare for centuries, to terrorize, humiliate, and undermine the morale of the enemy. Rape was also used as an act of ethnic cleansing to produce babies that share the perpetrators' ethnicity. Forced pregnancy has been noted in places including Bangladesh, Darfur, and Bosnia. More broadly, pregnancy commonly results from wartime rape that was perpetrated without the intention of impregnating the enemy, as has been found in conflicts in East Timor, Liberia, Kosovo, and Rwanda. Gita Sahgal of Amnesty International commented that, rather than being primarily about "spoils of war" or sexual gratification, rape is often used in ethnic conflicts as a way for attackers to perpetuate social control and redraw ethnic boundaries. Children may be born to women and girls forced to "marry" abductors and occupiers; this happened in the Indonesian occupation of East Timor and in the Lord's Resistance Army's conflict in Uganda.

Rape during war is recognized under United Nations Security Council Resolution 1820 as a war crime and a crime against humanity. "Forced pregnancy" is specifically enumerated as a war crime and crime against humanity in the Rome Statute, which was the "first international criminal tribunal ever officially to criminalize forced pregnancy".

Children born as the result of wartime rape may be identified with the enemy and grow up stigmatized and excluded by their communities; they may be denied basic rights or even killed before reaching adulthood. Children are particularly at risk for such abuse when they are visibly identifiable as sharing half their ethnicity with the occupying forces, as in the case of half-Arab children of Darfuri women raped by janjaweed soldiers as part of the war in Darfur. Children of war rape are also at risk due to neglect by traumatized mothers unable to provide sufficient care.

=== Rape of Nanking ===
In 1937 the Japanese army took over Nanking, which at the time was the capital of China. In the resulting seven-week occupation known as the Rape of Nanking, as many as 80,000 women were raped. Chinese women and girls of all ages were raped, mutilated, tortured, sexually enslaved, and killed; unknown numbers of them were left pregnant. Many pregnant Nanking women killed themselves in 1938, and others committed infanticide when their babies were born. During the rest of the 20th century there was no record of any Chinese woman acknowledging her child as having been born as a result of the Rape of Nanking.

=== Bosnian War ===
During the 1992–1995 Bosnian War, pregnancy from rape was used to perpetrate genocide. There were reports of deliberately created "rape camps" intended to impregnate captive Muslim and Croatian women. Women were reported to have been kept in confinement until their pregnancies had advanced beyond a stage at which abortion would be safe. In the context of a patrilineal society, in which children inherit their father's ethnicity, such camps were intended to create a new generation of Serbian children. The women's group Tresnjevka claimed that more than 35,000 women and children were held in such Serb-run camps. Estimates range from 20,000 to 50,000 victims. Feryal Gharahi of Equality Now reported:

Families were separated, and women and children were kept in the gym, where all of the women and girls over ten years old were raped in the first few days.... There are rape camps all over the country. Thousands of women are being raped and killed. Thousands of women are pregnant as a result of rape. Over and over again, everywhere I went in Bosnia-Herzegovina and in Croatian refugee camps, women told me stories of abomination – of being kept in a room, raped repeatedly and told they would be held until they gave birth to Serbian children.

After the Bosnian War, the International Criminal Court updated its statute to prohibit "confin[ing] one or more women forcibly made pregnant, with the intent of affecting the ethnic composition of any population".

== Treatment and outcomes ==
Immediate post-rape protocols call for medical professionals to assess the likelihood that a victim will become pregnant in their assessment of the physical damage done to the woman. Protocol for gaining a history of the use of contraceptives, as a woman's use of birth control pills or other contraceptives before a rape affect her chance of becoming pregnant. Treatment protocols also call for clinicians to provide access to emergency contraception and counseling on abortion in countries where it is legal. High-dose estrogen pills were tried as an experimental treatment after rape in the 1960s, and in 1972 Canadian physician A. Albert Yuzpe and his colleagues began systematic studies on the use of ethinylestradiol and norgestrel to provide emergency contraception after an assault. These treatments reduced the rate of pregnancy after rape by 84%. This method is now called the Yuzpe regimen. Before being treated with pregnancy prevention measures, a rape victim is given a HCG pregnancy test to determine whether she was already pregnant before the rape.

When being discharged from emergency care, clinicians provide information about pregnancy as well as other complications such as infection and emotional trauma. While a woman who has become pregnant during the past 48 hours will test negative for pregnancy in an HCG pregnancy test (unless she was already pregnant before the rape), pregnancy resulting from the rape can be detected at the two-week follow-up visit.

Decisions of whether to end a rape-related pregnancy or carry it to term, and whether to keep the child or place the child for adoption can be severely traumatizing for a woman. Abortion rates for pregnancies due to rape vary significantly by culture and demographics; women who live in countries where abortion is illegal must often give birth to the child or secretly undergo a dangerous, unsafe abortion. Some women do not wish to get abortions for religious or cultural reasons. In a third of cases, rape-related pregnancies are not discovered until the second trimester of pregnancy, which may reduce a woman's options, particularly if she doesn't have easy access to legal abortion or is still recovering from the trauma of the rape itself.

In the United States, 1 percent of 1,900 women questioned in 1987 listed rape or incest as the reason for having an abortion; of these, 95 percent named other reasons as well. A 1996 study of thousands of US women showed that, of pregnancies resulting from rape, 50% were aborted, 12% resulted in miscarriage, and 38% were brought to term and either placed for adoption or raised. Peer-reviewed studies have reported from 38% of American women to 90% of Peruvian adolescents carrying the pregnancy to term. In Lima, Peru, where abortion is illegal, 90% of girls aged 12 to 16 who became pregnant through rape carried the child to term. Of all children born, 1% are placed for adoption; the number of children conceived from rape who are placed for adoption was found to be about 6% in one study and 26% in another. When a mother commits neonaticide, killing an infant younger than 24 hours old, the child's birth being the result of rape is a main cause, although other psychological and situational factors are generally present. Some people turn to drugs or alcohol to cope with emotional trauma after a rape; use of these during pregnancy can harm the fetus.

== Children of rape ==
When a mother chooses to raise her child conceived in rape, the traumatic effect of the rape and the child's biological relationship to the rapist has the potential to create some psychological challenges, but the circumstance of conception is no guarantee to cause psychological problems. If a woman decides to keep and raise the child, she may have difficulty accepting them, and both mother and child may face ostracism in some societies.

Mothers may also face legal difficulties. In most US states, the rapist maintains parental rights. Research by legal scholar Shauna Prewitt indicates that the resulting continued contact with the rapist is damaging for women who keep the child. She wrote in 2012 that in the US, 31 states allow rapists to assert custody and visitation rights over children conceived through rape.

== History ==
=== Infanticide ===
Children whose births result from rape have been killed by their mothers at various times in history. During ancient and medieval times, such infanticide was not prohibited (however, penance was expected of these mothers in medieval Europe).

=== Beliefs about whether rape can result in pregnancy ===
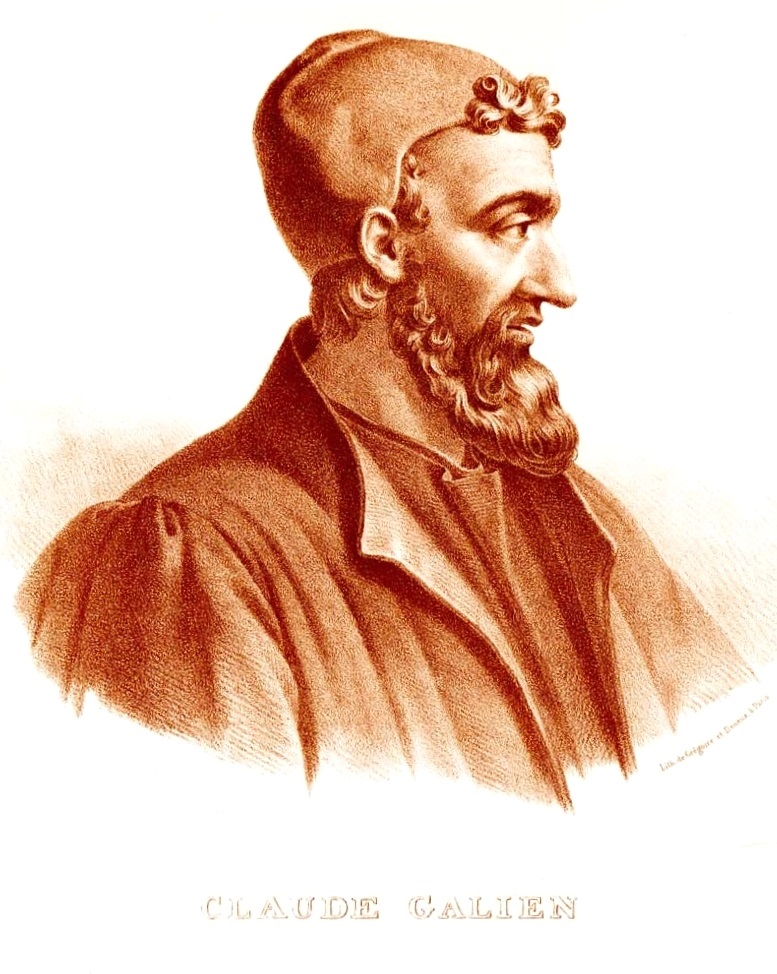
The Ancient Greek physician Galen's belief that women could not conceive without pleasure influenced medical and legal thinking for centuries.

Beliefs that rape could not lead to pregnancy were widespread in both legal and medical opinion for centuries. Galen, an ancient Greek physician, believed that a woman must experience pleasure to release "seed" and become pregnant, and could not derive such pleasure from nonconsensual sex. Galen's thinking influenced understanding from medieval England to Colonial America. Aristotle disagreed, as he believed that "women's bodies were not hot enough to produce semen". Female reproduction was, in many ways, viewed through the lens of male reproductive processes, imagining that female organs functioned as inverted versions of male organs, and hence orgasm was required for conception.

Centuries later, in medieval Europe, the belief that pregnancy could not occur without consent was still standard; in fact, conception by a woman was considered a legitimate defense against charges of rape. The belief was codified in the medieval British law texts Fleta and Britton. Britton states:

If the defendant confesses the fact, but says that the woman at the same time conceived by him, and can prove it, then our will is that it be adjudged no felony, because no woman can conceive if she does not consent.

Medieval literary scholar Corinne Saunders acknowledged a difficulty in determining how widely held was the belief that pregnancy implies consent, but concluded that it influenced "at least some justices", citing a 1313 case in Kent. Against this, in his popular 12th-century Dragmaticon, the early Scholastic philosopher William of Conches noted the objection of Geoffrey of Plantagenet—count of Anjou in France and father of King Henry II of England—to Galen's idea, stating that it was certain that some rape resulted in births; William acknowledged that this occurred but averred that it was merely proof that some or all women experienced involuntary carnal pleasure from the act despite their lack of rational consent. However, the same rationale was used as an explanation for the supposed infrequency of births among prostitutes.

By the late 1700s, scientists no longer universally accepted the view that pregnancy was impossible without pleasure, although this view was still common. A 1795 British legal text, Treatise of Pleas of the Crown, disparaged the belief's legal utility and its biological veracity:

Also it hath been said by some to be no rape to force a woman who conceives at the time; for it is said, that if she had not consented, she could not have conceived, but this opinion seems very questionable, not only because the previous violence is no way extenuated by such a subsequent consent, but also because, if it were necessary to shew that the woman did not conceive, the offender could not be tried till such time as it might appear whether she did or did not, and likewise because the philosophy of this notion may very well be doubted of.

The 1814 British legal text Elements of Medical Jurisprudence by Samuel Farr claimed that conception "probably" could not occur without a woman's "enjoyment", so that an "absolute rape" was unlikely to lead to pregnancy. On the other hand, in the US in an 1820 court case in the Arkansas Territory a man pleaded not guilty to rape charges because the victim became pregnant, but the court rejected the argument:

The old notion that if the woman conceive, it could not be a rape, because she must have in such case have consented, is quite exploded. Impregnation, it is well known, does not depend on the consciousness or volition of the female. If the uterine organs be in a condition favorable to impregnation, this may take place as readily as if the intercourse was voluntary.

In more recent times, opponents of legal abortion have argued that pregnancy resulting from rape is rare. In a 1972 article, physician and anti-abortion activist Fred Mecklenburg argued that pregnancy from rape is "extremely rare", adding that a woman exposed to the trauma of rape "will not ovulate even if she is 'scheduled' to". Blythe Bernhard wrote in The Washington Post, "That article has influenced two generations of anti-abortion activists with the hope to build a medical case to ban all abortions without any exception."

== Islamic law ==
Historian Ian Talbot has written about how countries with Quran-based Islamic codes on rape and pregnancy use Sura An-Nur, verse 2, as a legal basis: "The law of evidence in all sexual crimes required either self-confession or the testimony of four upright (salah) Muslim males. In the case of a man, self-confession involved a verbal confession. However, for women, medical examinations and pregnancy arising from rape were admissible as proof of self-guilt." Under Islamic law, a woman can kill her rapist.

== Male victims ==
Pregnancy from rape can also occur when the victim is male and the rapist is female. Many such cases involve the statutory rape of underage boys by adult women who subsequently became pregnant. In Kansas, Hermesmann v. Seyer established that a 13-year-old male victim of rape can be held liable to pay child support for a baby that results from the rape, and later cases in the United States have held likewise.

== See also ==
- Abortion-rights movements
- Effects and aftermath of rape
- Rape and pregnancy statement controversies in the 2012 United States elections
- Reproductive coercion
- Sociobiological theories of rape
- Unintended pregnancy
- War on women

== Bibliography ==
- Carpenter, R. Charli (25 June 2007). Born of War: Protecting Children of Sexual Violence Survivors in Conflict Zones. Kumarian Press. ISBN 978-1-56549-237-0.
- de Brouwer, Anne-Marie (2005). Supranational Criminal Prosecution of Sexual Violence: The ICC and the Practice of the ICTY and the ICTR. Intersentia nv. ISBN 978-90-5095-533-1.
- Hazelwood, Robert R.; Burgess, Ann Wolbert (2009). Practical Aspects of Rape Investigation: A Multidisciplinary Approach. CRC Press. ISBN 978-1-4200-6504-6.
- Jenkins, Jon L.; Braen, G. Richard (1 August 2004). Manual of Emergency Medicine, 5e. Lippincott Williams & Wilkins. ISBN 978-0-7817-5035-6.
- Krug, Etienne G.; World Health Organization (2002). World Report on Violence and Health. World Health Organization. ISBN 978-92-4-154561-7.
- Price, Sally (2007). Mental Health in Pregnancy and Childbirth. Elsevier Health Sciences. ISBN 978-0-443-10317-9.
- Smith, Merril D. (2004). Encyclopedia of Rape. Greenwood Publishing Group. ISBN 978-0-313-32687-5.
