= Levonorgestrel acetate =

Chemical compound

Clinical data
- Other names: LNG-A; LNGA; 3-Ketonorgestimate; Levonorgestrel 17β-acetate; D-(–)-Norgestrel 17β-acetate; 17α-Ethynyl-18-methylestr-4-en-17β-ol-3-one 17β-acetate; 17β-Acetoxy-13β-ethyl-17α-ethynylgon-4-en-3-one
- Drug class: Progestogen; Progestogen ester

Identifiers
- IUPAC name: [(8R,9S,10R,13S,14S,17R)-13-Ethyl-17-ethynyl-3-oxo-1,2,6,7,8,9,10,11,12,14,15,16-dodecahydrocyclopenta[a]phenanthren-17-yl] acetate
- CAS Number: 13732-69-9 18290-31-8
- PubChem CID: 62954
- ChemSpider: 56666
- UNII: VF642934XZ
- CompTox Dashboard (EPA): DTXSID301314299
- ECHA InfoCard: 100.123.252

Chemical and physical data
- Formula: C_{23}H_{30}O_{3}
- Molar mass: 354.490 g·mol^{−1}
- 3D model (JSmol): Interactive image
- SMILES: CC[C@]12CC[C@H]3[C@H]([C@@H]1CC[C@]2(C#C)OC(=O)C)CCC4=CC(=O)CC[C@H]34
- InChI: InChI=1S/C23H30O3/c1-4-22-12-10-19-18-9-7-17(25)14-16(18)6-8-20(19)21(22)11-13-23(22,5-2)26-15(3)24/h2,14,18-21H,4,6-13H2,1,3H3/t18-,19+,20+,21-,22-,23-/m0/s1; Key:YDQDJLTYVZAOQX-GOMYTPFNSA-N

Levonorgestrel acetate (LNG-A), or levonorgestrel 17β-acetate, also known as 3-ketonorgestimate, is a progestin which was never marketed. It is a progestogen ester and is the C17β acetate ester and a prodrug of levonorgestrel. Norgestimate is the C3 oxime of LNG-A. The drug is a minor active metabolite of norgestimate, which is a prodrug of norelgestromin and to a lesser extent of levonorgestrel and LNG-A. LNG-A has high affinity for the progesterone receptor, about 135% of that of promegestone (relative to 150% for levonorgestrel). Along with levonorgestrel butanoate, LNG-A was investigated as a hormonal contraceptive by the Population Council.

== See also ==
- List of progestogen esters
