= Emergency contraceptives on college campuses =

Emergency contraception, such as the morning-after pill, has been made more easily accessible on college campuses in the United States since the 2010s. It can be distributed through health centers and through health and wellness vending machines, which are intended to alleviate fears of social stigma.

== History ==
Stanford University obtained an on campus emergency contraception vending machine in September of 2017. They offer the morning after pill for $25

The Shippensburg University in Pennsylvania was the first school to offer the morning-after pill in vending machines. During the Obama administration in 2012, the university’s student association advocated for the installment of the machine. A poll taken by Shippensburg showed that 85% of the students approved of the idea. The morning-after pill is sold in these vending machines for $25, alongside items such as cough drops, condoms, and pregnancy tests. These additional items bring an aspect of privacy to purchases from the machine. The first vending machine was placed in the University’s student center, however, some students worried the placement was too public. At the time of installation, the morning-after pill was only available to those over 17 years of age. The university, however, stated that none of their students were under the age of 17, so the law would not be a concern.

From Shippensburg, the concept spread to other universities, with students advocating for the same emergency contraceptive accessibility. After two years of students advocating, the University of California, Davis installed a vending machine in 2017. In September 2017, Stanford implemented a morning-after-pill vending machine, offering a generic version of the pill for $25. At the University of California, Davis students worked to install a “Health and Wellness” vending machine on campus after a Plan B shortage at their local pharmacy in 2017. In March 2022, Boston University unveiled its contraceptive vending machine which offers the morning-after pill for $7.25. Lastly, Hamilton College implemented a Sexual Health Vending Machine onto their campus which offers emergency contraception for $10.

The Society for Emergency Contraception launched the “Emergency Contraception for Every Campus” project in 2019 to expand access to emergency contraception for college students. The project focuses on adding vending machines to campuses most at risk for lack of contraception, including historically black colleges, catholic-affiliated schools, campuses in states with restricted access, and universities with low graduation rates.

The overturning of Roe V. Wade encouraged a wave of student activists to promote the availability of emergency contraceptives on campuses. Students at George Washington University led a movement to include emergency contraception in vending machines in discrete locations across campus. Before their placement in 2023, the students ran a program named “Foggy Bottom Plan B,” in which students could anonymously receive emergency contraception delivered to their dorm from other students.

The Power to Decide campaign, a nonprofit aiming to prevent unplanned pregnancies, introduced a new program in June 2023 aimed at providing sexual and reproductive services, including emergency contraceptives to historically black colleges, at little to no cost.

A study from the American Health Association in 2022 found that 74.1% of Student Health Services provide Emergency Contraception to students. As of July 2023, 39 schools have the morning-after pill vending machine and 20 schools were looking into the idea. According to a study by the National Institutes of Health situated in North Carolina, emergency contraception, as of 2024, was only available at a third of the state's colleges and universities, with an availability deficit localized at religious and/or smaller institutions.

Boston University opened their emergency contraception vending machine in March 2022. The vending machine offers the morning after pill for $7.25

== Accessibility ==
Emergency contraceptive pills may be inaccessible to college students because of price or proximity to a pharmacy. Campuses that provide emergency contraceptive pills may price them between $7.25 and $30.00.

== Legislation ==
The 2010 Patient Protection and Affordable Care Act issued guidelines requiring group health insurance plans to cover FDA-approved emergency contraceptives for women, directly through the plan, or indirectly distributed through the government. The act's final regulations in 2013 included insurance offered by both public and private universities. Wheaton College, a private Christian college in Illinois, sued the government for being forced to permit the utilization of their healthcare plans for emergency contraceptive coverage, arguing it violated the First and Fifth Amendments. The Supreme Court gave Wheaton some relief following its decision in Burwell v. Hobby Lobby Stores, Inc., but the Seventh Circuit Court of Appeals still denied Wheaton's request for exemption from the Affordable Care Act.

As of July 2023, in both Illinois and New York, legislation is being crafted to require vending machine access to Emergency Contraception at all state colleges.
