= Norgestimate =

Chemical compound

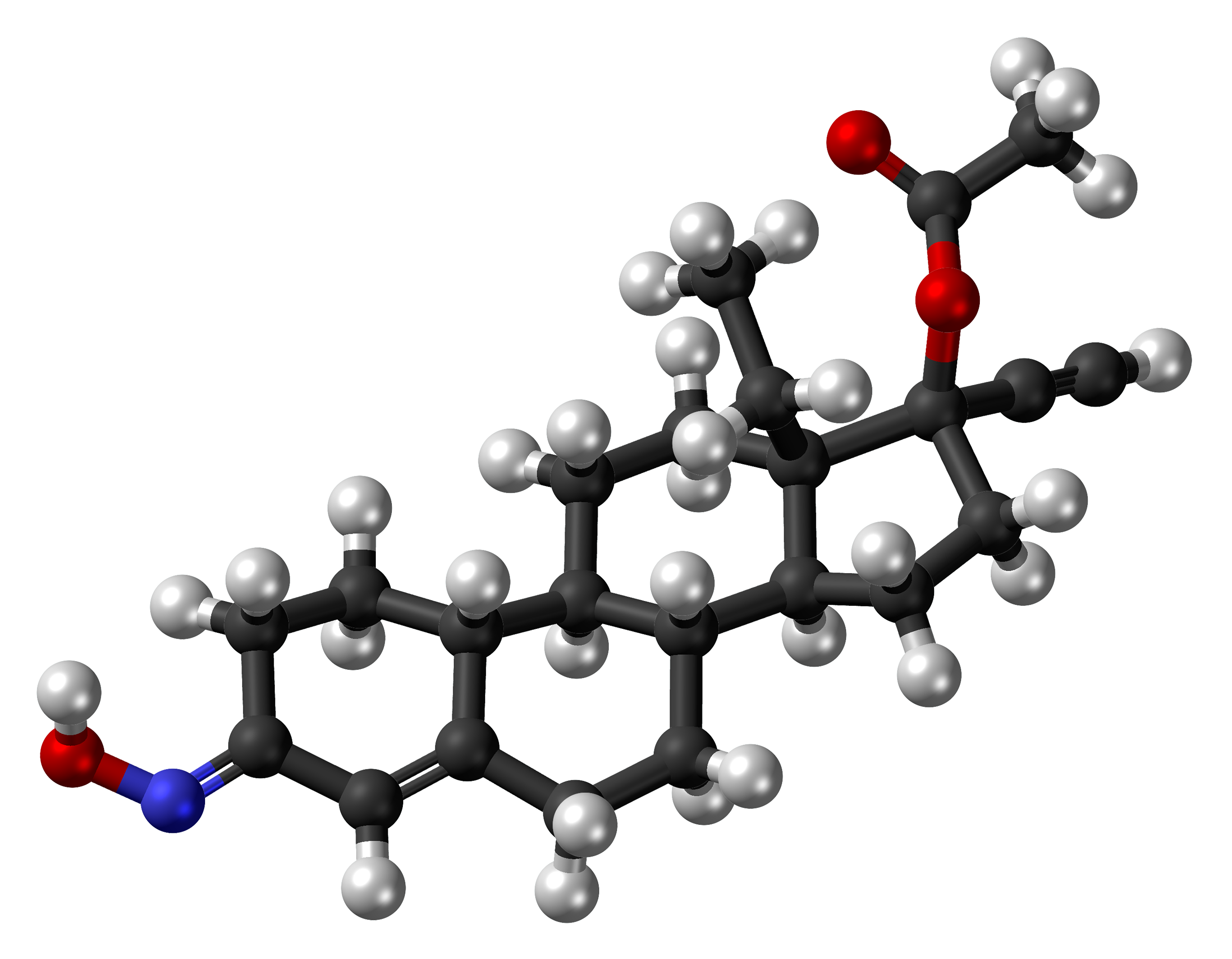

Clinical data
- Trade names: Ortho Tri-Cyclen, others
- Other names: NGM; ORF-10131; Levonorgestrel acetate oxime; Levonorgestrel 17β-acetate 3-oxime; 17α-Ethynyl-18-methyl-19-nortestosterone 3-oxime 17β-acetate; 17α-Ethynyl-18-methylestr-4-en-17β-ol-3-one 3-oxime 17β-acetate
- AHFS/Drugs.com: Professional Drug Facts; Professional Drug Facts
- MedlinePlus: a601050
- License data: US DailyMed: Norgestimate
- Pregnancy category: Use is contraindicated
- Routes of administration: By mouth
- Drug class: Progestogen; Progestin; Progestogen ester
- ATC code: G03AA11 (WHO) G03FA13 (WHO) (only combinations with estrogens)

Legal status
- Legal status: US: ℞-only

Pharmacokinetic data
- Bioavailability: Unknown
- Protein binding: • Norelgestromin: 99% (to albumin) • Levonorgestrel: 98% (to albumin and SHBG) • Levonorgestrel acetate: ? (to albumin)
- Metabolism: Liver, intestines (deacetylation, reduction, hydroxylation, conjugation)
- Metabolites: • Norelgestromin • Levonorgestrel • Levonorgestrel acetate
- Elimination half-life: • Norgestimate: very short • Norelgestromin: 17–37 hours • Levonorgestrel: 24–32 hours
- Excretion: Urine: 47% Feces: 37%

Identifiers
- IUPAC name: [(3E,8R,9S,10R,13S,14S,17R)-13-ethyl-17-ethynyl-3-hydroxyimino-1,2,6,7,8,9,10,11,12,14,15,16-dodecahydrocyclopenta[a]phenanthren-17-yl] acetate
- CAS Number: 35189-28-7
- PubChem CID: 6540478
- IUPHAR/BPS: 7091
- DrugBank: DB00957
- ChemSpider: 5022837
- UNII: C291HFX4DY
- KEGG: D05209
- ChEBI: CHEBI:50815
- ChEMBL: ChEMBL1200934
- CompTox Dashboard (EPA): DTXSID1046922
- ECHA InfoCard: 100.167.085

Chemical and physical data
- Formula: C_{23}H_{31}NO_{3}
- Molar mass: 369.505 g·mol^{−1}
- 3D model (JSmol): Interactive image
- Melting point: 214 to 218 °C (417 to 424 °F)
- SMILES: O=C(O[C@@]2(C#C)CC[C@H]1[C@H]4[C@H](CC[C@@]12CC)[C@@H]3/C(=C\C(=N\O)CC3)CC4)C
- InChI: InChI=1S/C23H31NO3/c1-4-22-12-10-19-18-9-7-17(24-26)14-16(18)6-8-20(19)21(22)11-13-23(22,5-2)27-15(3)25/h2,14,18-21,26H,4,6-13H2,1,3H3/b24-17+/t18-,19+,20+,21-,22-,23-/m0/s1; Key:KIQQMECNKUGGKA-NMYWJIRASA-N

Norgestimate, sold under the brand name Ortho Tri-Cyclen among others, is a progestin medication which is used in birth control pills for women and in menopausal hormone therapy. The medication is available in combination with an estrogen and is not available alone. It is taken by mouth.

Side effects of the combination of an estrogen and norgestimate include menstrual irregularities, headaches, nausea, abdominal pain, breast tenderness, mood changes, and others. Norgestimate is a progestin, or a synthetic progestogen, and hence is an agonist of the progesterone receptor, the biological target of progestogens like progesterone. It has very weak androgenic activity and no other important hormonal activity. The medication is a prodrug of norelgestromin and to a lesser extent of levonorgestrel in the body.

Norgestimate was patented in 1965 and introduced for medical use, specifically in birth control pills, in 1986. It was introduced for use in menopausal hormone therapy in the United States in 1999. Norgestimate is sometimes referred to as a "third-generation" progestin. It is marketed in birth control pills widely throughout the world, whereas it is available for use in menopausal hormone therapy only in the United States and Brazil. Norgestimate is available as a generic medication. In 2023, the combination with ethinylestradiol was the 97th most commonly prescribed medication in the United States, with more than 7 million prescriptions.

== Medical uses ==
Norgestimate is used in hormonal contraception and in menopausal hormone therapy for the treatment of menopausal symptoms. It is used in combination with ethinylestradiol in birth control pills and in combination with estradiol in menopausal hormone therapy.

=== Available forms ===
Norgestimate is available only in combination with the estrogens ethinylestradiol and estradiol. These formulations are for use by mouth and are indicated specifically for hormonal contraception and menopausal hormone therapy. Norgestimate is not available on its own (i.e., as a standalone medication).

== Side effects ==
Norgestimate has mostly been studied in combination with an estrogen, so the side effects of norgestimate specifically or on its own have not been well-defined.

Side effects associated with the combination of ethinylestradiol and norgestimate in premenopausal women, with greater than or equal to 2% incidence over up to 24 menstrual cycles, include headache/migraine (33%), abdominal/gastrointestinal pain (7.8%), vaginal infection (8.4%), vaginal discharge (6.8%), breast issues (including breast pain, discharge, and enlargement) (6.3%), mood disorders (including depression and mood alterations) (5.0%), flatulence (3.2%), nervousness (2.9%), and rash (2.6%).

Side effects associated with the combination of estradiol and norgestimate in postmenopausal women, with greater than or equal to 5% incidence over one year, include headache (23%), upper respiratory tract infection (21%), breast pain (16%), back pain (12%), abdominal pain (12%), flu-like symptoms (11%), arthralgia (9%), vaginal bleeding (9%), dysmenorrhea (8%), sinusitis (8%), vaginitis (7%), pharyngitis (7%), fatigue (6%), pain (6%), nausea (6%), viral infection (6%), flatulence (5%), tooth disorder (5%), myalgia (5%), dizziness (5%), depression (5%), and coughing (5%).

== Pharmacology ==
=== Pharmacodynamics ===
Norelgestromin, also known as 17β-deacetylnorgestimate, the main active metabolite of norgestimate.

Norgestimate is a rapidly and completely converted prodrug, mainly of norelgestromin (17β-deacetylnorgestimate or levonorgestrel 3-oxime), but also of levonorgestrel (3-keto-17β-deacetylnorgestimate) to a lesser extent (22 ± 6% of an administered dose or about 40–70 μg) and of levonorgestrel acetate (levonorgestrel 17β-acetate) in very small amounts. Via its active metabolites, norgestimate has progestogenic activity, antigonadotropic effects, very weak androgenic activity, and no other important hormonal activity.

Relative affinities (%) of norgestimate and metabolites
| Compound | PR | AR | ER | GR | MR | SHBG | CBG |
|---|---|---|---|---|---|---|---|
| Norgestimate | 15 | 0 | 0 | 1 | 0 | 0 | 0 |
| Norelgestromin (17β-deAc-NGM) | 10 | 0 | ? | ? | ? | 0 | ? |
| Levonorgestrel (3-keto-17β-deAc-NGM) | 150–162 | 45 | 0 | 1–8 | 17–75 | 50 | 0 |
| Levonorgestrel 17β-acetate (3-keto-NGM) | 135 | ? | 0 | ? | ? | 0 | ? |
Notes: Values are percentages (%). Reference ligands (100%) were promegestone for the PR, metribolone for the AR, E2 for the ER, DEXA for the GR, aldosterone for the MR, DHT for SHBG, and cortisol for CBG. Sources:

==== Progestogenic activity ====
Norgestimate is a progestogen, or an agonist of the progesterone receptor. The relative binding affinities of norgestimate and its active metabolites for the progesterone receptor compared to promegestone (100%) are 15% for norgestimate, 10% for norelgestromin, 150% for levonorgestrel, and 135% for levonorgestrel acetate. Because of their low concentrations, norgestimate and levonorgestrel acetate are not thought to contribute significantly to the biological activity of norgestimate. In addition, although levonorgestrel binds to the progesterone receptor with much higher affinity than norelgestromin, levonorgestrel has high affinity for sex hormone-binding globulin (SHBG) (87% of that of testosterone), which may limit its activity, whereas norelgestromin does not bind to SHBG. The ovulation-inhibiting dosage of norgestimate is 200 μg/day.

==== Androgenic activity ====
In addition to its progestogenic activity, norgestimate has weak androgenic activity. However, the medication shows less androgenic activity than related 19-nortestosterone progestins like levonorgestrel and norethisterone. Norgestimate and norelgestromin have negligible affinity for the androgen receptor (both 0% of the affinity of metribolone), while levonorgestrel has considerable affinity for the androgen receptor (45% of that of metribolone). In addition to their lack of affinity for the androgen receptor, norgestimate and norelgestromin have virtually no affinity for SHBG, and therefore do not displace testosterone from this carrier protein (although levonorgestrel does still bind with high affinity to SHBG and hence could increase free testosterone levels via occupation of SHBG). In accordance, clinical trials of norgestimate have observed minimal androgenic side effects in women treated with the medication. As an example, clinical studies have found that norgestimate does not appreciably inhibit the increase in SHBG levels produced by ethinylestradiol. This is of interest because estrogens increase and androgens decrease liver production of SHBG and by extension circulating levels of SHBG.

The relative binding affinity of norgestimate and its metabolite norelgestromin for the rat prostatic androgen receptor (AR) are 0.3% and 1.3% of those of dihydrotestosterone (DHT), respectively, whereas the respective values for levonorgestrel and gestodene are 22% and 15%. Based on these findings, the ratios of AR to PR binding are 219 for norgestimate and 48 for norelgestromin, whereas the ratios for progesterone, levonorgestrel, and gestodene are 93, 11, and 28, respectively. As such, norgestimate and norelgestromin would appear to have much lower androgenic potency than other 19-nortestosterone progestins. However, levonorgestrel is an important metabolite of both norgestimate and norelgestromin, and it may serve to increase their androgenic potency to some degree.

When norgestimate is combined with ethinylestradiol, which is potently antiandrogenic, there are only antiandrogenic effects overall and the combination is suitable for treatment of hyperandrogenism.

==== Other activities ====
Norgestimate and its active metabolites do not bind to other steroid hormone receptors besides the progesterone and androgen receptors and hence have no other off-target hormonal activity. This includes estrogenic, glucocorticoid, antimineralocorticoid, and neurosteroid activity. However, levonorgestrel has been found to inhibit 5α-reductase and hepatic cytochrome P450 enzymes in vitro to some extent.

=== Pharmacokinetics ===
Norgestimate is rapidly and almost completely metabolized into its active metabolites, mainly norelgestromin (the primary active metabolite) and to a lesser extent levonorgestrel, upon oral ingestion. As a result, only very low concentrations (70 pg/mL) of norgestimate itself are detectable in the circulation, and only for about 6 hours after an oral dose. The oral bioavailability of norgestimate is unknown. This is due to the rapid and extensive metabolism of norgestimate, which makes determination of overall bioavailability difficult and necessitates methods other than area-under-the-curve (AUC) to do so. Peak levels of norelgestromin (3,500 pg/mL) are reached at approximately 2 hours following administration of norgestimate. Co-administration of norgestimate with a high-fat meal has been found to significantly decrease peak levels of norelgestromin, although the area-under-the-curve levels of norelgestromin are not significantly altered by food. Steady-state levels of norelgestromin and levonorgestrel are reached within 21 days of treatment with norgestimate. There is an approximate 2-fold accumulation in levels of norelgestromin and a non-linear approximate 8-fold accumulation in levels of levonorgestrel with continuous administration of norgestimate. The accumulation of levonorgestrel is thought to be a result of its high affinity for SHBG, which limits its biological activity. The plasma protein binding of norelgestromin is approximately 99% and it is bound to albumin but not to SHBG. Conversely, levonorgestrel is approximately 98% bound to plasma proteins and is bound to both albumin and SHBG.

Norgestimate is extensively metabolized into its active metabolites during first-pass metabolism in the liver and intestines. The major metabolite of norgestimate is norelgestromin and is formed from norgestimate via deacetylation in the liver and intestines. A more minor metabolite of norgestimate is levonorgestrel, which accounts for 20 to 25% (22 ± 6%) of an administered dose or about 40 to 70 μg norgestimate, and a very minor metabolite of norgestimate is levonorgestrel 17β-acetate. Both of these metabolites are active similarly to norgelstromin. With a typical oral contraceptive dosage of norgestimate of 200 to 250 μg/day, an amount of 50 to 60 μg/day levonorgestrel may be produced. This is similar to the ovulation-inhibiting dosage of levonorgestrel, and suggests that norgestimate may act in considerable part as a prodrug specifically of levonorgestrel. Following their formation, the active metabolites of norgestimate are inactivated via reduction, hydroxylation, and conjugation into levonorgestrel metabolites. The terminal half-life of norelgestromin is between 17 and 37 hours and of levonorgestrel is between 24 and 32 hours. The metabolites of norgestimate are eliminated 47% in urine and 37% in feces. Unchanged norgestimate is undetectable in urine.

== Chemistry ==
Norgestimate, also known as 17α-ethynyl-18-methyl-19-nortestosterone 3-oxime 17β-acetate or as 17α-ethynyl-18-methylestr-4-en-17β-ol-3-one 3-oxime 17β-acetate, is a synthetic estrane steroid and a derivative of testosterone. It is a racemic mixture of E and Z isomers. Norgestimate is more specifically a derivative of norethisterone (17α-ethynyl-19-nortestosterone) and is a member of the gonane (18-methylestrane) subgroup of the 19-nortestosterone family of progestins. It is the C3 oxime and C17β acetate ester of levonorgestrel and is also known as levonorgestrel acetate oxime. A related compound is norethisterone acetate oxime (norethisterone-3-oxime 17β-acetate).

== History ==
Norgestimate was introduced as a component of combined oral contraceptives in 1986. Based on its year of introduction, norgestimate is sometimes described as a "third-generation" progestin. Norgestimate was approved in combination with estradiol for use in menopausal hormone therapy in 1999 in the United States, and a generic version of this preparation became available in this country in 2005.

== Society and culture ==
=== Generic names ===
Norgestimate is the generic name of the drug and its INN, USAN, USP, BAN, and DCF. It is also known by its developmental code name ORF-10131.

=== Brand names ===
Norgestimate is marketed in combination with ethinylestradiol as a birth control pill under the brand names Amicette, Cilest, Cyclen, Edelsin, Effiprev, Estarylla, MonoNessa, Orlon, Ortho Tri-Cyclen, Ortho Tri-Cyclen Lo, Ortho-Cyclen, Pramino, Previfem, Sprintec, Triafemi, TriCilest, Tri-Cyclen, Tri-Cyclen LO, Tridette, Tri-Estarylla, Tri-Linyah, TriNessa, Tri-Previfem, and Tri-Sprintec. It is marketed in combination with estradiol for menopausal hormone therapy under the brand name Prefest.

=== Availability ===
Norgestimate in combination with ethinylestradiol is marketed widely throughout the world, including in the United States, Canada, the United Kingdom, Ireland, elsewhere throughout Europe, South Africa, Latin America, and Asia. Unlike the combined birth control pills of norgestimate with ethinylestradiol, the combination of norgestimate with estradiol, sold under the brand name Prefest for menopausal hormone therapy, is reportedly only marketed in the United States and Brazil.

== Research ==
A 2017 study found that norgestimate inhibits staphylococcal biofilm formation and resensitizes methicillin-resistant Staphylococcus aureus to β-lactam antibiotics. In contrast, norelgestromin showed much weaker activity, indicating that the acetyl group of norgestimate is important for the activity. It was suggested by the researchers that norgestimate may be a promising lead compound for the development of new antibiotics.
