= A. Albert Yuzpe =

Canadian obstetrician-gynecologist (1936–2025)

Abraham Albert "Al" Yuzpe (1936 – 13 November 2025) was a Canadian obstetrician-gynecologist known for his work on human fertility and emergency contraception. The Yuzpe regimen, named after him, is a method of reducing potential unwanted pregnancies, including pregnancy from rape. He published the first studies demonstrating the method's safety and efficacy in 1974.

== Life and career ==
Yuzpe earned his MD, MSc. and completed his fellowship in Obstetrics and Gynecology at the University of Western Ontario in London, Ontario. Yuzpe founded one of the first IVF centres in Canada at the University of Western Ontario in 1982.

He was a Fellow of the Medical Research Council of Canada for two years, with his research focusing on the development and refinement of fertility promoting drugs, including clomiphene citrate and human menopausal gonadotropins.

Yuzpe joined the Faculty of Medicine, Department of Obstetrics and Gynecology, where he held the position of Full Professor until retiring in 1995. He was co-founder and co-director of Genesis Fertility Centre, and then became co-founder and co-director of Olive Fertility Centre where he currently practices. Yuzpe has received the Canadian Fertility and Andrology Society Award of Excellence in Reproductive Medicine, and The Society of Obstetricians and Gynecologists Presidents Award "For his distinguished career in academic reproductive endocrinology and infertility and his dedication to women's health in Canada and abroad."

Yuzpe died on 13 November 2025, at the age of 89.

== Selected publications ==
- AA Yuzpe, Z Liu, MR Fluker Rescue intracytoplasmic sperm injection (ICSI)—salvaging in vitro fertilization (IVF) cycles after total or near-total fertilization failure. Fertility and sterility, 2000
- MR Fluker, WM Hooper, AA Yuzpe Withholding gonadotropins. Fertility and sterility, 1999
- MD Hornstein, R Hemmings, AA Yuzpe Use of nafarelin versus placebo after reductive laparoscopic surgery for endometriosis. Fertility and sterility, 1997
- MD Hornstein, AA Yuzpe, KA Burry, LR Heinrichs Prospective randomized double-blind trial of 3 versus 6 months of nafarelin therapy for endometriosis associated pelvic pain. Fertility and sterility 1995
- M Alsalili, A Yuzpe, I Tummon, J Parker, J Martin Pregnancy: Cumulative pregnancy rates and pregnancy outcome after in-vitro fertilization:> 5000 cycles at one centre... - Human ..., 1995
- CR Newton, MT Hearn, AA Yuzpe Psychological assessment and follow-up after in vitro fertilization: assessing the impact of failure. Fertility and sterility, 1990
- AA Yuzpe Pneumoperitoneum needle and trocar injuries in laparoscopy. A survey on possible contributing factors and prevention. The Journal of Reproductive Medicine, 1990
- MT Hearn, AA Yuzpe, SE Brown Psychological characteristics of in vitro fertilization participants. American journal of ..., 1987
- Richard P. Dickey, A. Albert Yuzpe (1985). Managing Cyclomen (Danazol) Patients.
- Jacques-E. Rioux, A. Albert Yuzpe (1982). Gynecologic endoscopic equipment.
- AA Yuzpe, RP Smith, AW Rademaker A multicenter clinical investigation employing ethinyl estradiol combined with dl-norgestrel as postcoital contraceptive agent. Fertility and sterility, 1982
- R Minielly, AA Yuzpe, CG Drake (1979). Subarachnoid hemorrhage secondary to ruptured cerebral aneurysm in pregnancy Obstetrics & Gynecology, 1979
- Jacques-E. Rioux, A. Albert Yuzpe (1979). Evaluation of Female Sterilization Procedures
- AA Yuzpe, WJ Lancee (1977). Ethinylestradiol and dl-norgestrel as a postcoital contraceptive. Fertility and sterility, 1977
- AA Yuzpe, HJ Thurlow, I Ramzy... Post coital contraception—A pilot study. The Journal of ..., 1974
- A. Albert Yuzpe, Jacques E. Rioux (1973). A manual of laparoscopy
