= Norelgestromin =

Pharmaceutical drug

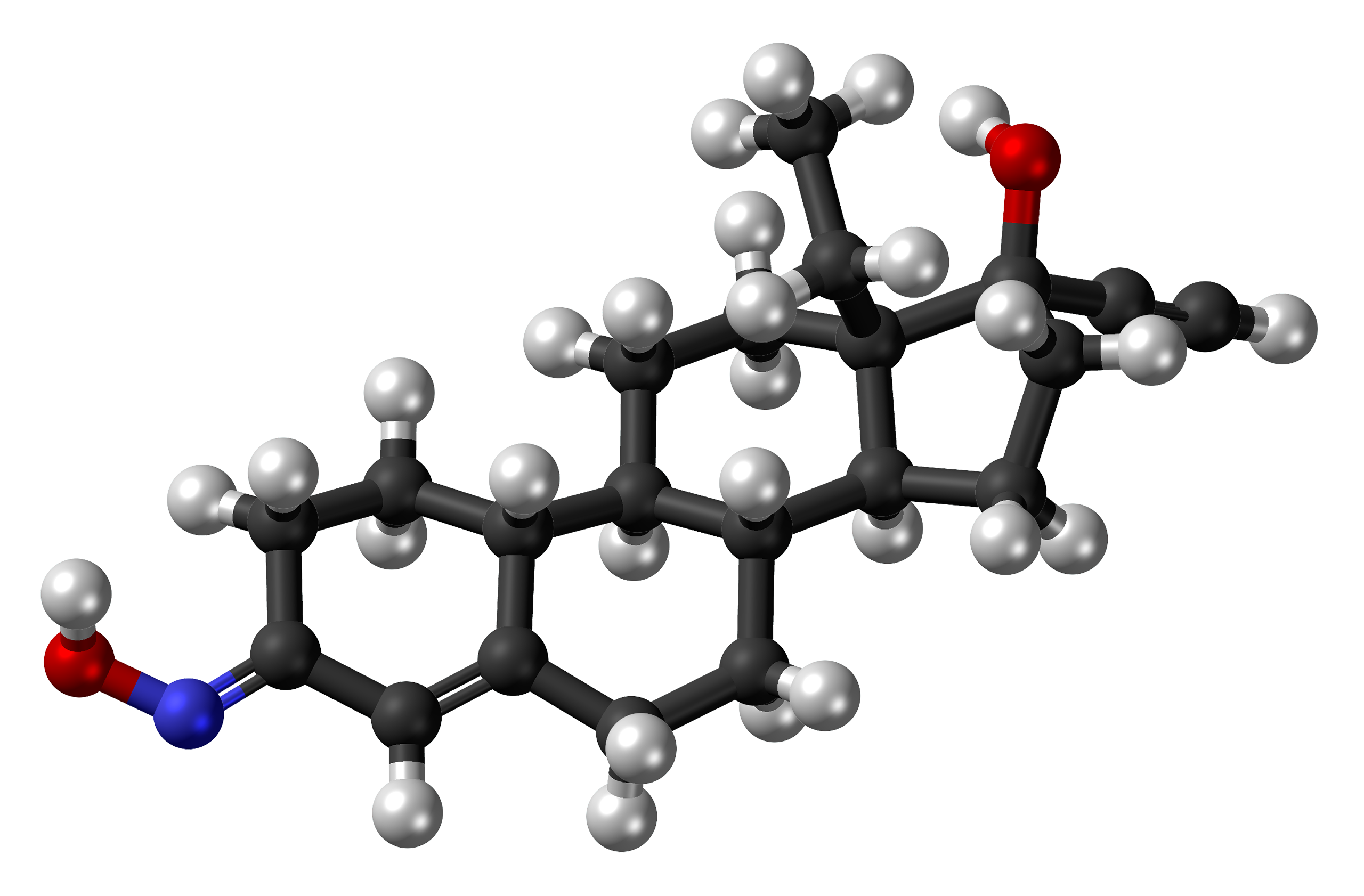

Clinical data
- Trade names: Evra, Ortho Evra, Xulane, others
- Other names: Norelgestromine; NGMN; RWJ-10553; Levonorgestrel 3-oxime; 17β-Deacetylnorgestimate; 17α-Ethynyl-18-methyl-19-nortestosterone 3-oxime; 17α-Ethynyl-18-methylestr-4-en-17β-ol-3-one 3-oxime
- AHFS/Drugs.com: International Drug Names
- MedlinePlus: a602006
- License data: EU EMA: by INN
- Routes of administration: Transdermal patch
- Drug class: Progestogen; Progestin
- ATC code: G03AA13 (WHO) (only combinations with estrogens)

Legal status
- Legal status: In general: ℞ (Prescription only)

Pharmacokinetic data
- Protein binding: 99% (to albumin but not to SHBG)
- Metabolism: Liver (oxime to ketone reaction, hydroxylation, conjugation)
- Metabolites: • Levonorgestrel
- Elimination half-life: 17–37 hours
- Excretion: Urine and feces

Identifiers
- IUPAC name: (8R,9S,10R,13S,14S,17R)-13-ethyl-17-ethynyl-3-hydroxyimino-1,2,6,7,8,9,10,11,12,14,15,16-dodecahydrocyclopenta[a]phenanthren-17-ol
- CAS Number: 53016-31-2
- PubChem CID: 62930
- DrugBank: DB06713
- ChemSpider: 56648
- UNII: R0TAY3X631
- KEGG: D05205
- ChEBI: CHEBI:135398
- ChEMBL: ChEMBL1200807
- CompTox Dashboard (EPA): DTXSID9046788
- ECHA InfoCard: 100.170.714

Chemical and physical data
- Formula: C_{21}H_{29}NO_{2}
- Molar mass: 327.468 g·mol^{−1}
- 3D model (JSmol): Interactive image
- SMILES: ON=C4\C=C3/[C@@H]([C@H]2CC[C@]1([C@@H](CC[C@]1(C#C)O)[C@@H]2CC3)CC)CC4
- InChI: InChI=1S/C21H29NO2/c1-3-20-11-9-17-16-8-6-15(22-24)13-14(16)5-7-18(17)19(20)10-12-21(20,23)4-2/h2,13,16-19,23-24H,3,5-12H2,1H3/t16-,17+,18+,19-,20-,21-/m0/s1; Key:ISHXLNHNDMZNMC-XUDSTZEESA-N

Norelgestromin, or norelgestromine, sold under the brand names Evra and Ortho Evra among others, is a progestin medication which is used as a method of birth control for women. The medication is available in combination with an estrogen and is not available alone. It is used as a patch that is applied to the skin.

Side effects of the combination of an estrogen and norelgestromin include menstrual irregularities, headaches, nausea, abdominal pain, breast tenderness, mood changes, and others. Norelgestromin is a progestin, or a synthetic progestogen, and hence is an agonist of the progesterone receptor, the biological target of progestogens like progesterone. It has very weak androgenic activity and no other important hormonal activity.

Norelgestromin was introduced for medical use in 2002. It is sometimes referred to as a "third-generation" progestin. Norelgestromin is marketed widely throughout the world. It is available as a generic medication.

== Medical uses ==
Norelgestromin is used in combination with ethinyl estradiol in contraceptive patches. These patches mediate their contraceptive effects by suppressing gonadotropin levels as well as by causing changes in the cervical mucus and endometrium that diminish the likelihood of pregnancy.

=== Available forms ===
Norelgestromin is available only as a transdermal contraceptive patch in combination with ethinyl estradiol. The Ortho Evra patch is a 20 cm^{2}, once-weekly adhesive that contains 6.0 mg norelgestromin and 0.6 mg ethinyl estradiol and delivers 200 μg/day norelgestromin and 35 μg/day ethinyl estradiol.

== Side effects ==
Norelgestromin has mostly been studied in combination with an estrogen, so the side effects of norelgestromin specifically or on its own have not been well-defined. Side effects associated with the combination of ethinylestradiol and norelgestromin as a transdermal patch in premenopausal women, with greater than or equal to 2.5% incidence over 6 to 13 menstrual cycles, include breast symptoms (including discomfort, engorgement, and/or pain; 22.4%), headaches (21.0%), application site reactions (17.1%), nausea (16.6%), abdominal pain (8.1%), dysmenorrhea (7.8%), vaginal bleeding and menstrual disorders (6.4%), mood, affect, and anxiety disorders (6.3%), vomiting (5.1%), diarrhea (4.2%), vaginal yeast infections (3.9%), dizziness (3.3%), acne (2.9%), migraine (2.7%), weight gain (2.7%), fatigue (2.6%), and pruritus (2.5%).

== Pharmacology ==
=== Pharmacodynamics ===
Norelgestromin is a progestogen. It is one of the active metabolites of norgestimate. Unlike many related progestins, norelgestromin reportedly has negligible androgenic activity. However, it produces levonorgestrel as an active metabolite to some extent, which does have some androgenic activity. Nonetheless, transdermally-administered norelgestromin does not counteract the increase in sex hormone-binding globulin levels produced by ethinyl estradiol.

Relative affinities (%) of norelgestromin and metabolites
Compound	PR	AR	ER	GR	MR	SHBG	CBG
Norelgestromin	10	0	?	?	?	0	?
Levonorgestrel (3-keto-NGMN)	150–162	45	0	1–8	17–75	50	0
Notes: Values are percentages (%). Reference ligands (100%) were prome- gestone for the PR, metribolone for the AR, E2 for the ER, DEXA for the GR, aldosterone for the MR, DHT for SHBG, and cortisol for CBG. Sources:

=== Pharmacokinetics ===
Upon application of a transdermal patch containing norelgestromin and ethinyl estradiol, plateau levels of both are reached by approximately 48 hours, and steady-state levels are reached within 2 weeks of application. Absorption following application to the buttock, upper outer arm, abdomen, and upper torso was assessed and, while absorption from the abdomen was slightly lower, it was considered to be therapeutically equivalent for the various areas. Mean levels of norelgestromin at steady-state ranged from 0.305 ng/mL to 1.53 ng/mL, with an average of about 0.725 ng/mL. The plasma protein binding of norelgestromin is 99%, and it is bound to albumin but not to sex hormone-binding globulin.

The metabolism of norelgestromin takes place in the liver and is via transformation into levonorgestrel (conversion of the C3 oxime into a ketone) as well as hydroxylation and conjugation. However, because norelgestromin is used parenterally, first-pass metabolism in the liver and gastrointestinal tract that normally occurs with oral administration are avoided. The biological half-life of norelgestromin is 17 to 37 hours. The metabolites of norelgestromin, along with those of ethinyl estradiol, are eliminated in the urine and feces.

== Chemistry ==
Norelgestromin, also known as 17α-ethynyl-18-methyl-19-nortestosterone 3-oxime or as 17α-ethynyl-18-methylestr-4-en-17β-ol-3-one 3-oxime, is a synthetic estrane steroid and a derivative of testosterone. It is a racemic mixture of E and Z isomers, which have approximately the same activity. Norelgestromin is more specifically a derivative of norethisterone (17α-ethynyl-19-nortestosterone) and is a member of the gonane (18-methylestrane) subgroup of the 19-nortestosterone family of progestins. It is the C3 oxime derivative of levonorgestrel and the C17β deacetyl derivative of norgestimate and is also known as levonorgestrel 3-oxime and as 17β-deacetylnorgestimate. A related progestin is norethisterone acetate oxime (17α-ethynyl-19-nortestosterone 3-oxime 17β-acetate).

== History ==
Norelgestromin was introduced for medical use in 2002.

== Society and culture ==
=== Generic names ===
Norelgestromin is the generic name of the drug and its INN, USAN, and BAN. The combined ethinyl estradiol and norelgestromin contraceptive patch is also known by its developmental code name RWJ-10553.

=== Brand names ===
Norelgestromin is marketed under the brand names Evra, Ortho Evra, Xulane, and others, all in combination with ethinylestradiol.

=== Availability ===
Norelgestromin is marketed widely throughout the world, including in the United States, Canada, the United Kingdom, Ireland, elsewhere throughout Europe, South Africa, Latin America, Asia, and elsewhere in the world. It is not listed as being marketed in Australia, New Zealand, Japan, South Korea, China, India, or certain other countries.

== Research ==
A transdermal gel formulation of norgelstromin and ethinyl estradiol was under development by Antares Pharma for use as a method of birth control with the code name AP-1081 but development was discontinued.

== See also ==
- Ethinylestradiol/norelgestromin
