= Breast tension =

Constellation of symptoms involving the breasts

Breast tension is a constellation of symptoms involving the breasts including:

- Breast pain (also called mastalgia)
- Breast engorgement

It can be a side effect of estrogen-containing drugs used for hormone replacement therapy during menopause.
