= Zinc transporter ZIP10 =

Protein found in humans

SLC39A10

Identifiers
- Aliases: SLC39A10, LZT-Hs2, solute carrier family 39 member 10
- External IDs: OMIM: 608733; MGI: 1914515; GeneCards: SLC39A10

Gene location (Human)
Chr.	Chromosome 2 (human)
Band	2q32.3	Start	195,575,977 bp
Band	2q32.3	End	195,737,702 bp

Gene location (Mouse)
Chr.	Chromosome 1 (mouse)
Band	1|1 C1.1	Start	46,846,704 bp
Band	1|1 C1.1	End	46,932,012 bp
RNA expression pattern
Bgee	Human / Mouse (ortholog); Top expressed in: middle temporal gyrus; secondary oocyte; Brodmann area 46; superior frontal gyrus; Brodmann area 23; germinal epithelium; postcentral gyrus; right lobe of thyroid gland; dorsolateral prefrontal cortex; Brodmann area 9 / Top expressed in: hand; hair follicle; otolith organ; utricle; secondary oocyte; primitive streak; primary motor cortex; cingulate gyrus; piriform cortex; primary oocyte; More reference expression data
BioGPS	n/a
Gene ontology
Molecular function	metal ion transmembrane transporter activity; zinc ion transmembrane transporter activity
Cellular component	integral component of membrane; plasma membrane; membrane; integral component of plasma membrane
Biological process	metal ion transport; negative regulation of B cell apoptotic process; positive regulation of protein tyrosine phosphatase activity; zinc ion transport; ion transport; positive regulation of B cell proliferation; transmembrane transport; cellular zinc ion homeostasis; positive regulation of B cell receptor signaling pathway; zinc ion import across plasma membrane
Sources:Amigo / QuickGO
Orthologs
Databases	NCBI: entry; OMA: entry
Species	Human	Mouse
Entrez	57181	227059
Ensembl	ENSG00000196950	ENSMUSG00000025986
UniProt	Q9ULF5	Q6P5F6
RefSeq (mRNA)	NM_001127257; NM_020342	NM_172653; NM_001356416; NM_001356417
RefSeq (protein)	NP_001120729; NP_065075	NP_766241; NP_001343345; NP_001343346
Location (UCSC)	Chr 2: 195.58 – 195.74 Mb	Chr 1: 46.85 – 46.93 Mb
PubMed search
- Wikidata
View/Edit Human	View/Edit Mouse

Zinc transporter ZIP10, also known as solute carrier family 39 member 10, is a protein that in humans is encoded by the SLC39A10 gene. ZIP10 belongs to a subfamily of proteins that show structural characteristics of zinc transporters, and have 14 members in the human genome: ZIP1, ZIP2, ZIP3, ZIP4, ZIP5, ZIP6, ZIP7, ZIP8, ZIP9, ZIP10, ZIP11, ZIP12, ZIP13 and ZIP14.
