= Zinc transporter protein =

Zinc transporter proteins (Zrt), or simply zinc transporters, are membrane transport proteins of the solute carrier family which control the membrane transport of zinc and regulate its intracellular and cytoplasmic concentrations. They include two major groups: (1) the zinc transporter (ZnT) or solute carrier 30 (SLC30) family, which controls the efflux of zinc from the cytoplasm out of the cell and from the cytoplasm into vesicles; and (2) the zinc importer, Zrt- and Irt-like protein (ZIP), or solute carrier 39A (SLC39A) family, which controls the influx of zinc into the cytoplasm from outside the cell and from vesicles.

At least one zinc transporter, ZIP9, is also a G protein-coupled receptor and membrane androgen receptor.

== Families ==
=== ZnT (SLC30) ===
Cation efflux (diffusion facilitator) protein
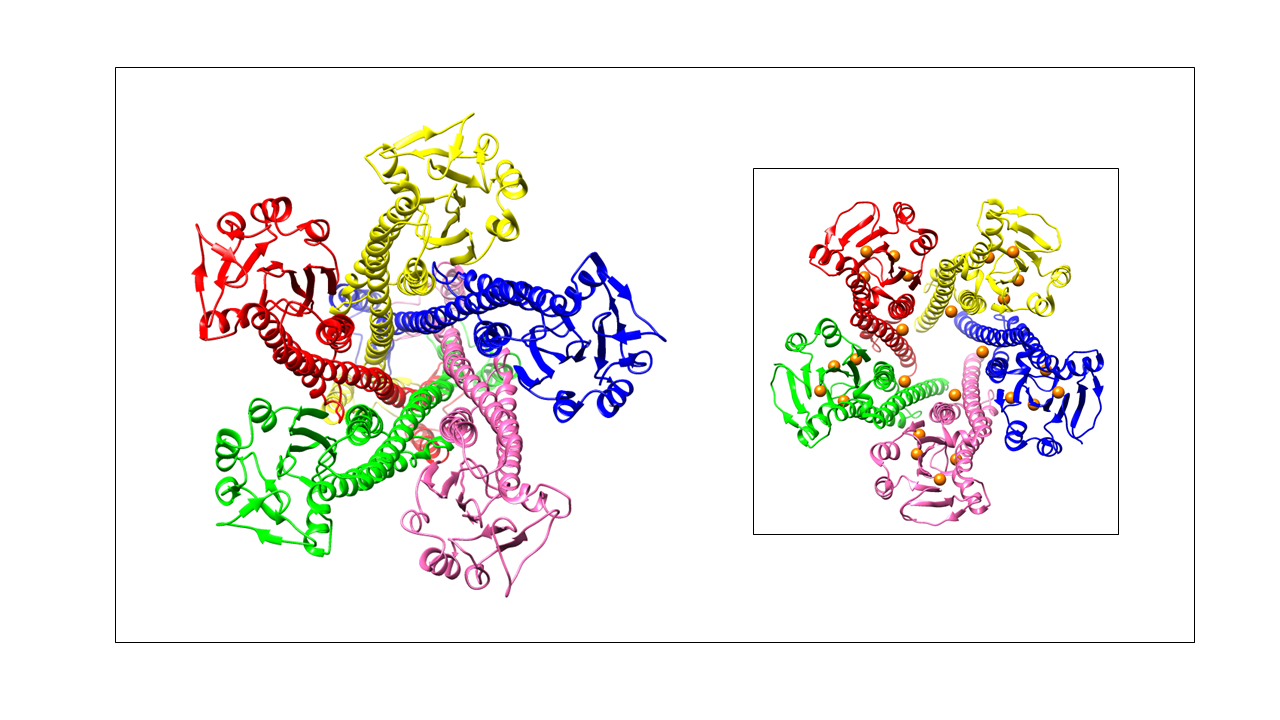
- ZntB Transporter Protein Structure: The left side of the image shows the full-length ZntB protein structure, without the presence of zinc. The right side shows the cytoplasmic domain of the protein and the apparent conformation change undergone by the protein to accommodate zinc transport. The conformation change is believed to be necessary for zinc ion transport. The chlorine ions (illustrated as the orange circles) support the conclusion that a change in the electrostatics and pH are necessary for transport.

Identifiers
- Symbol: Cation_efflux
- Pfam: PF01545
- InterPro: IPR002524
Available protein structures:
- PDB: IPR002524 PF01545 (ECOD; PDBsum)
- AlphaFold: IPR002524; PF01545

Members: ZnT1, ZnT2, ZnT3, ZnT4, ZnT5, ZnT6, ZnT7, ZnT8, ZnT9, ZnT10

Bacterial members of the family are known to increase tolerance to high salt concentrations.

==== ZntB Zinc Transporter Protein ====
Unlike some other zinc transporter proteins, the mechanism of how Zn^{2+} is transported via ZntB is not well understood. However, scientists have been able to speculate that the transport of Zn^{2+} is related to pH gradient and the electrostatics of the protein membrane.

=== ZIP (SLC39) ===
Zinc/iron permease

Identifiers
- Symbol: ZIP
- Pfam: PF02535
- InterPro: IPR003689
Available protein structures:
- PDB: IPR003689 PF02535 (ECOD; PDBsum)
- AlphaFold: IPR003689; PF02535

ZIP1, ZIP2, ZIP3, ZIP4, ZIP5, ZIP6, ZIP7 (Catsup), ZIP8, ZIP9, ZIP10, ZIP11, ZIP12, ZIP13, ZIP14

The structure of a bacterial ZIP protein has been resolved.
