= Zinc transporter ZIP9 =

Protein found in humans

SLC39A9

Identifiers
- Aliases: SLC39A9, ZIP-9, ZIP9, solute carrier family 39 member 9
- External IDs: MGI: 1914820; GeneCards: SLC39A9

Gene location (Human)
Chr.	Chromosome 14 (human)
Band	14q24.1	Start	69,398,015 bp
Band	14q24.1	End	69,462,390 bp

Gene location (Mouse)
Chr.	Chromosome 12 (mouse)
Band	12|12 C3	Start	80,690,657 bp
Band	12|12 C3	End	80,730,116 bp
RNA expression pattern
Bgee	Human / Mouse (ortholog); Top expressed in: parotid gland; jejunal mucosa; corpus epididymis; mucosa of sigmoid colon; skin of thigh; islet of Langerhans; caput epididymis; stromal cell of endometrium; palpebral conjunctiva; skin of hip / Top expressed in: lacrimal gland; salivary gland; epithelium of stomach; submandibular gland; duodenum; large intestine; colon; molar; parotid gland; jejunum; More reference expression data
BioGPS	n/a
Gene ontology
Molecular function	metal ion transmembrane transporter activity
Cellular component	integral component of membrane; membrane
Biological process	metal ion transport; zinc ion transport; ion transport; transmembrane transport
Sources:Amigo / QuickGO
Orthologs
Databases	NCBI: entry; OMA: entry
Species	Human	Mouse
Entrez	55334	328133
Ensembl	ENSG00000029364	ENSMUSG00000048833
UniProt	Q9NUM3	Q8BFU1
RefSeq (mRNA)	NM_001252148; NM_001252150; NM_001252151; NM_001252152; NM_018375 NM_001330185	NM_026244
RefSeq (protein)	NP_001239077; NP_001239079; NP_001239080; NP_001239081; NP_001317114 NP_060845	NP_080520
Location (UCSC)	Chr 14: 69.4 – 69.46 Mb	Chr 12: 80.69 – 80.73 Mb
PubMed search
- Wikidata
View/Edit Human	View/Edit Mouse

Zinc transporter ZIP9, also known as Zrt- and Irt-like protein 9 (ZIP9) and solute carrier family 39 member 9, is a protein that in humans is encoded by the SLC39A9 gene. This protein is the ninth member out of 14 ZIP family proteins, and is a membrane androgen receptor (mAR) coupled to G proteins that is classified as a zinc transporter protein. ZIP family proteins transport zinc metal from the extracellular environment into cells through cell membrane.

== Classification and nomenclature ==
Mammalian cells have two major groups of zinc transporter proteins; the ones that export zinc from the cytoplasm to the extracellular space (efflux), which are called ZnT (SLC30 family), and ZIP (SLC39 family) proteins whose functions are in the opposite direction (influx). ZIP family proteins are named as Zrt- and Irt-like proteins because of their similarities to Zrt and Irt proteins which are respectively zinc and iron -regulated transporter proteins in yeast and Arabidopsis that were discovered earlier than ZIP and ZnT proteins. ZIP family consists of four subfamilies (I, II, LIV-1, and gufA), and ZIP9 is the only member of subfamily I.

== Isoforms ==
ZIP9 can be present as three different isoforms in human cells. The canonical isoform of this protein has a length of 307 amino acids, with a molecular mass of 32251 Da. In the second isoform, amino acids 135–157 are missing, so its length and molecular weight are respectively reduced to 284 amino acids and 29931 Da. In the third isoform the amino acids 233–307 are missing, so the isoform only has 232 amino acids and its molecular mass is 24626 Da. Additionally, the last amino acid of isoform 3, which is usually serine, is replaced with aspartic acid.

ZIP9 Isoforms and Sizes
Isoform	number of amino acids	size (Da)	transformation	missing amino acids
isoform 1	307	32251	N/A	N/A
isoform 2	284	29931	N/A	135-157
isoform 3	232	24626	S → D	233-307

== Discovery ==
ZIP9 membrane androgen receptor was first discovered in Atlantic croaker (Micropogonias undulatus) brain, ovary and testicular tissues and named "AR2" in 1999, together with another androgen receptor which was found only in brain tissue, and it was named "AR1" in that time. AR1 and AR2 were first thought to be nuclear androgen receptors (nAR), however, further studies on their biochemical and functional features in 2003 illustrated that they were involved in non-genomic mechanisms in the plasma membrane of the cells and were membrane androgen receptors. In 2005, the similarities between the nucleotide and amino acid sequences of AR2 and ZIP family proteins were discovered in other vertebrates, suggesting that AR2 is from this family of proteins. A study in 2014 utilised the latest research technologies to clone and express a particular cDNA of the female Atlantic croaker ovaries, which encoded a protein showing the characteristics of the canonical isoform of ZIP9, as a novel membrane androgen receptor(mAR).

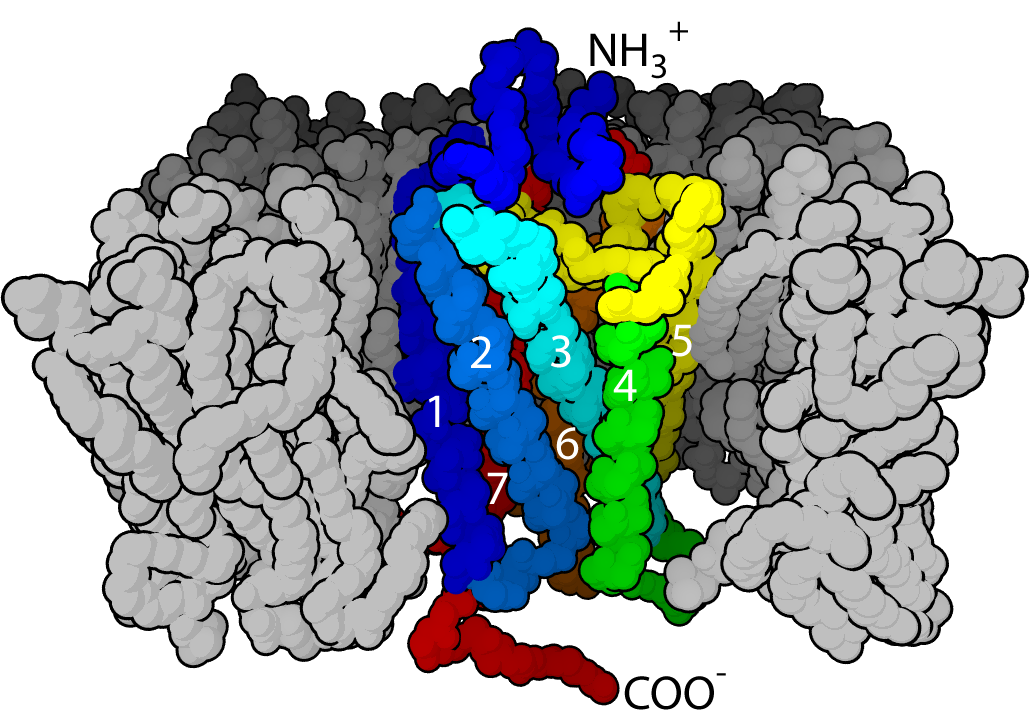
The seven-transmembrane α-helix structure of a G protein–coupled receptor, with intracellular C-terminus

== Structure ==
Unlike other ZIP subfamilies that are consisted of 8 transmembrane (TM) domains with an extracellular C-terminal, ZIP9 consists of a 7 TM structure with an intracellular C-terminus. ZIP9 is shorter than other ZIP proteins, and only has about 307 amino acids within its structure, however, like other ZIP proteins, between its domains III and IV, within the intracellular loop, it contains histidine-rich clusters. ZIP9 and other ZIP proteins have polar or charged amino acids in their TM domains which probably play important roles in making ion transfer channels and therefore in importing zinc ions into cytoplasm.

== Location, expression and function ==
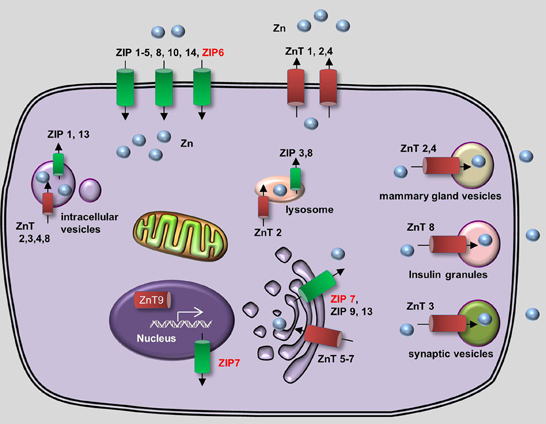
The image illustrates the location of different zinc transporters in a cell, including ZIP9, which is located at Golgi here.

ZIP9 influxes zinc ions into the cytosol and its gene is expressed almost in every tissue of human body. The sub-cellular location of ZIP9 is in plasma, nucleus, endoplasmic reticulum and mitochondrial membrane. One of the responsibilities of ZIP9 is the homeostasis of zinc in the secretory pathway, during which this protein stays within the Trans Golgi Network regardless of the change in the concentrations of zinc.

ZIP9 is the only ZIP protein that signals through G protein binding, and pharmaceutical agents decrease its ligand binding once ZIP9 is uncoupled from G proteins. ZIP9 is also the only member of ZIP family with mAR characteristics.

== Ligands ==
Testosterone has high affinity for ZIP9 with a K_{d} of 14 nM and acts as an agonist of the receptor. In contrast, the other endogenous androgens dihydrotestosterone (DHT) and androstenedione show low affinity for the receptor with less than 1% of that of testosterone, although DHT is still effective in activating the receptor at sufficiently high concentrations. Moreover, the synthetic androgens mibolerone and metribolone (R-1881), the endogenous androgen 11-ketotestoterone, and the other steroid hormones estradiol and cortisol are all ineffective competitors for the receptor. Since mibolerone and metribolone bind to and activate the nuclear androgen receptor (AR) but not ZIP9, they could potentially be employed to differentiate between AR- and ZIP9-mediated responses of testosterone. The nonsteroidal antiandrogen bicalutamide has been identified as an antagonist of ZIP9.

== Clinical significance ==
Zinc homeostasis is very important in human health, because zinc is present in the structure of some proteins like zinc-dependent metalloenzymes and zinc-finger-containing transcriptional factors. In addition, zinc is involved in signalling for cell growth, proliferation, division and apoptosis. As a result, any dysfunction of zinc transporter proteins can be harmful for the cells, and some of them are associated with different cancers, diabetes and inflammation. For instance, through activation of ZIP9, testosterone has been found to increase intracellular zinc levels in breast cancer, prostate cancer, and ovarian follicle cells and to induce apoptosis in these cells, an action which may be mediated partially or fully by increased zinc concentrations.

=== Gene mutations ===
Mutations in the SLC39A9 gene can occur due to genetic deletion of the q24.1-24.3 band of base pairs within the human chromosome 14. This interstitial deletion mutation deletes the SLC39A9 gene along with 18 other genes found close to the SLC39A9 gene on chromosome 14 Although specific gene associated diseases have not been determined, the deletion of this band causes diseases such as congenital heart defects, mild intellectual disability, brachydactyly, and all patients with band deletion had hypertelorism and a broad nasal bridge. Patient specific clinical issues included ectopic organs, undescended testes, also called cryptorchidism, and malrotation of the small intestine. Deletion mutation involving the SLC39A9 gene has also been reported in 23 cases of patients with circulation related cancers such as B-cell lymphoma and B-cell chronic lymphocytic leukaemia (CLL). Chimeric genes are a result of faulty DNA replication, and arise when two or more coding sequences of the same or different chromosome combine in order to produce a single new gene. SLC39A9 forms a chimeric gene product with a gene called PLEKHD1, that codes for an intracellular protein found within the cerebellum. A study done in Seattle, USA, established the presence of the fusion protein product of the SLC39A9-PLEKHD1 gene to be present in 124 cases of schizophrenia and was closely related to the pathophysiology of disease. The fusion protein had features from both the parent genes and also possessed the ability to interact with cellular signalling pathways involving kinases such as Akt and Erk, leading to their increased phosphorylation within the brain and a consequent onset of schizophrenia. SLC39A9 gene also forms a fusion transcript with another gene called MAP3K9, that encodes for MAP3 kinase enzyme. This SLC39A9-MAP3K9 fusion gene has a repetitive occurrence in breast cancers, demonstrated by a study done on 120 primary breast cancer samples from Korean women in 2015.

=== Cancer ===
==== Breast and prostate ====
A study in 2014, elucidated the intermediary role of ZIP9 in causing human breast and prostate cancer, as it induced the apoptosis in the presence of testosterone in breast and prostate cancerous cells. unlike ZIP1, 2 and 3, ZIP9 mRNA expression was increased in human prostate and breast malignant biopsy cancer cells, which probably was because cells that divide rapidly require more zinc.

==== Brain ====
Treatment of glioblastoma cells with TPEN showed that upregulation of ZIP9 in glioblastoma cells enhances cell migration in brain cancer by influencing P53 and GSK-3ß, and also ERK and AKT signalling pathways in phosphorylation after activation of B-cell receptors.

=== Diabetes ===
Zinc must be constantly supplied to Pancreatic β-cells to function normally and maintain glycaemic control. The insulin secretory pathway in humans is highly dependent on zinc activities. The cells lose many zinc ions during the secretion of insulin, and need to receive more zinc, and expression of ZIP9 mRNA during this process increases. As a result, ZIP9, which is involved in importing zinc into the cells, is potentially a target for therapeutic studies in the future regarding diabetes type2.

== See also ==
- GPRC6A
- Ion transporter
- Membrane androgen receptor
- Zinc transporter protein
- Atlantic croaker
- GPCR
