= Zinc deficiency =

Insufficient body levels of zinc

- Zinc
- Specialty: Endocrinology
- Causes: a diet high in phytate-containing whole grains

Zinc deficiency is defined either as insufficient body levels of zinc to meet the needs of the body, or as a zinc blood level below the normal range. However, since a decrease in blood concentration is detectable only after long-term or severe depletion, blood levels of zinc are not a reliable biomarker for zinc status. Common symptoms include increased rates of diarrhea. Zinc deficiency affects the skin and gastrointestinal tract; brain and central nervous system, immune, skeletal, and reproductive systems.

Zinc deficiency in humans is caused by reduced dietary intake, inadequate absorption, increased loss, or increased body system use. The most common cause is reduced dietary intake. In the U.S., the Recommended Dietary Allowance (RDA) is 8 mg/day for women and 11 mg/day for men.

The highest concentration of dietary zinc is found in oysters, meat, beans, and nuts. Increasing the amount of zinc in the soil and thus in crops and animals is an effective preventive measure. Zinc deficiency may affect up to 17% or 2 billion people worldwide.

== Signs and symptoms ==
=== Skin, nails, and hair ===
Zinc deficiency may manifest as acne, eczema, xerosis (dry, scaling skin), seborrheic dermatitis, or alopecia (thin and sparse hair). It may also impair or possibly prevent wound healing.

=== Mouth ===
Zinc deficiency can manifest as non-specific oral ulceration, stomatitis, or white tongue coating. Rarely it can cause angular cheilitis (sores at the corners of the mouth).

=== Vision, smell, and taste ===
Severe zinc deficiency may disturb the sense of smell and taste. Night-blindness may be a feature of severe zinc deficiency, although most reports of night-blindness and abnormal dark adaptation in humans with zinc deficiency have occurred in combination with other nutritional deficiencies (e.g., vitamin A).

=== Immune system ===
Impaired immune function in people with zinc deficiency can lead to the development of respiratory, gastrointestinal, or other infections, e.g., pneumonia. The levels of inflammatory cytokines (e.g., IL-1β, IL-2, IL-6, and TNF-α) in blood plasma are affected by zinc deficiency and zinc supplementation produces a dose-dependent response in the level of these cytokines. During inflammation, there is an increased cellular demand for zinc, and impaired zinc homeostasis from zinc deficiency is associated with chronic inflammation.

=== Diarrhea ===
Zinc deficiency contributes to an increased incidence and severity of diarrhea.

=== Appetite ===
Zinc deficiency may lead to loss of appetite.

=== Cognitive function and hedonic tone ===
Cognitive functions, such as learning and hedonic tone, are impaired with zinc deficiency. Moderate and more severe zinc deficiencies are associated with behavioral abnormalities, such as irritability, lethargy, and depression (e.g., involving anhedonia). Zinc supplementation produces a rapid and dramatic improvement in hedonic tone (i.e., general level of happiness or pleasure) under these circumstances. Zinc supplementation has been reported to improve symptoms of ADHD and depression.

=== Psychological disorders ===
Low plasma zinc levels have been alleged to be associated with many psychological disorders. Schizophrenia has been linked to decreased brain zinc levels. Evidence suggests that zinc deficiency could play a role in depression. Zinc supplementation may be an effective treatment in major depression.

=== Growth ===
Zinc deficiency in children can cause delayed growth and has been claimed to cause stunted growth in one-third of the world's population.

=== During pregnancy ===
Zinc deficiency during pregnancy can negatively affect both the mother and fetus. Animal studies indicate that maternal zinc deficiency can upset the sequencing and efficiency of the birth process. An increased incidence of difficult and prolonged labor, hemorrhage, uterine dystocia, and placental abruption has been documented in zinc-deficient animals. The defective functioning of estrogen may mediate these effects via the estrogen receptor, which contains a zinc finger protein. A review of pregnancy outcomes in women with acrodermatitis enteropathica, reported that out of every seven pregnancies, there was one abortion and two malfunctions, suggesting the human fetus is also susceptible to the teratogenic effects of severe zinc deficiency. However, a review of zinc supplementation trials during pregnancy did not report a significant effect of zinc supplementation on neonatal survival.

Zinc deficiency can interfere with many metabolic processes during infancy and childhood, a time of rapid growth and development when nutritional needs are high. Low maternal zinc status has been associated with less attention during the neonatal period and worse motor functioning. In some studies, supplementation has been associated with motor development in very low birth weight infants and more vigorous and functional activity in infants and toddlers.

=== Testosterone production ===
Zinc is required to produce testosterone. Thus, zinc deficiency can lead to reduced circulating testosterone, which could lead to sexual immaturity, hypogonadism, and delayed puberty.

== Causes ==
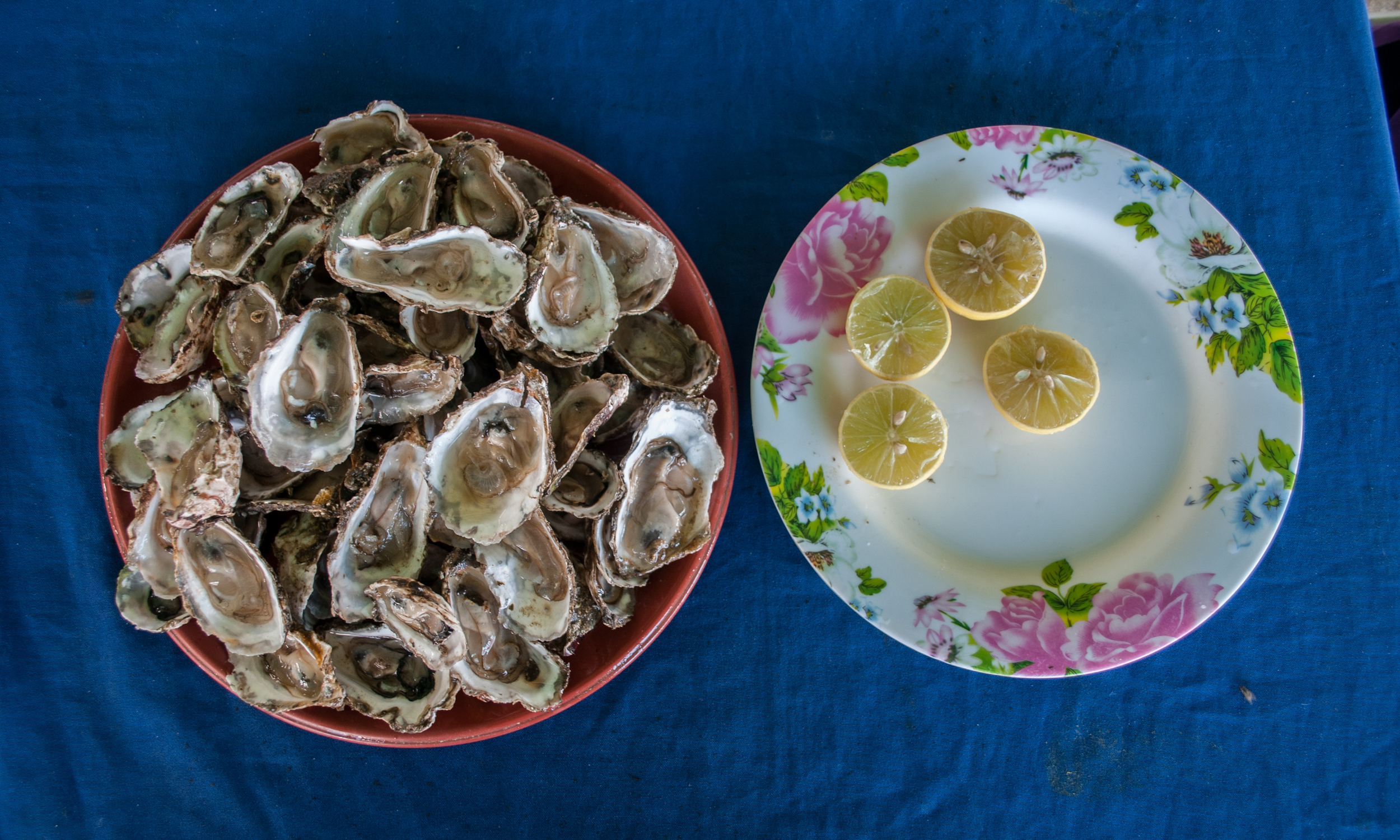
Oysters contain a high amount of zinc.

=== Dietary deficiency ===
Zinc deficiency can be caused by a diet high in phytate-containing whole grains, foods grown in zinc-deficient soil, or processed foods containing little or no zinc.

Conservative estimates suggest that 25% of the world's population is at risk of zinc deficiency.

In the U.S., the Recommended Dietary Allowance (RDA) is 8 mg/day for women and 11 mg/day for men. RDA for pregnancy is 11 mg/day. RDA for lactation is 12 mg/day. For infants up to 12 months, the RDA is 3 mg/day. For children ages 1–13 years the RDA increases with age from 3 to 8 mg/day.

The following table summarizes most of the foods with significant quantities of zinc, listed in order of quantity per serving, unfortified. Note that the top 10 entries are meat, beans, or nuts.

Food	mg in one serving	Percentage of 11 mg recommended daily intake
Oysters, cooked, breaded, and fried, 3 ounces (85 g) (about 5 average-sized oysters)	74.0	673%
Beef chuck roast, braised, 3 ounces (85 g)	7.0	64%
Crab, Alaska king, cooked, 3 ounces (85 g)	6.5	59%
Beef patty, broiled, 3 ounces (85 g)	5.3	48%
Cashews, dry roasted, 3 ounces (85 g)	4.8	44%
Lobster, cooked, 3 ounces (85 g)	3.4	31%
Pork chop, loin, cooked, 3 ounces (85 g)	2.9	26%
Baked beans, canned, plain, or vegetarian, 1/2 cup (~120 mL)	2.9	26%
Almonds, dry roasted, 3 ounces (85 g)	2.7	25%
Chicken, dark meat, cooked, 3 ounces (85 g)	2.4	22%
Yogurt, fruit, low fat, 8 ounces (230 g)	1.7	15%
Shredded wheat, unfortified, 1 cup (~240 mL)	1.5	14%
Chickpeas, cooked, 1/2 cup (~120 mL)	1.3	12%
Cheese, Swiss, 1 ounce (28 g)	1.2	11%
Oatmeal, instant, plain, prepared with water, 1 packet	1.1	10%
Milk, low-fat or non-fat, 1 cup (~240 mL)	1.0	9%
Kidney beans, cooked, 1/2 cup (~120 mL)	0.9	8%
Chicken breast, roasted, skin removed, 1/2 breast	0.9	8%
Cheese, cheddar, or mozzarella, 1 ounce (28 g)	0.9	8%
Peas, green, frozen, cooked, 1/2 cup (~120 mL)	0.5	5%
Flounder or sole, cooked, 3 ounces (85 g)	0.3	3%

Recent research findings suggest that increasing atmospheric carbon dioxide concentrations will exacerbate zinc deficiency problems in populations that consume grains and legumes as staple foods. A meta-analysis of data from 143 studies comparing the nutrient content of grasses and legumes grown in ambient and elevated CO_{2} environments found that the edible portions of wheat, rice, peas, and soybeans grown in elevated CO_{2} contained less zinc and iron. Global atmospheric CO_{2} concentration is expected to reach 550 p.p.m. in the late 21st century. At this CO_{2} level the zinc content of these crops was 3.3–9.3% lower than that of crops grown in the present atmosphere. A model of the nutritional impact of these lower zinc quantities on the populations of 151 countries predicts that an additional 175 million people could face dietary zinc deficiency as the result of increasing atmospheric CO_{2}.

=== Inadequate absorption ===
Acrodermatitis enteropathica is an inherited deficiency of the zinc transporter ZIP4 protein, resulting in inadequate zinc absorption. It presents as retarded growth, severe diarrhea, hair loss, skin rash (most often around the genitalia and mouth) and opportunistic candidiasis, and bacterial infections.Numerous small bowel diseases which cause destruction or malfunction of the gut mucosa enterocytes and generalized malabsorption are associated with zinc deficiency.

=== Increased loss ===
Exercising, high alcohol intake, and diarrhea increase the body's loss of zinc. Changes in intestinal tract absorbability and permeability due, in part, to viral, protozoal, or bacteria pathogens may also encourage fecal losses of zinc.

=== Chronic disease ===
The mechanism of zinc deficiency in some diseases has not been well defined; it may be multifactorial.

Wilson's disease, sickle cell disease, chronic kidney disease, and chronic liver disease have all been associated with zinc deficiency. It can also occur after bariatric surgery and exposure to mercury.Although marginal zinc deficiency is often found in depression, low zinc levels could either be a cause or a consequence of mental disorders and their symptoms.

== Mechanism ==
As biosystems cannot store zinc, regular intake is necessary. Excessively low zinc intake can lead to zinc deficiency, negatively impacting an individual's health. The mechanisms for the clinical manifestations of zinc deficiency are best appreciated by recognizing that zinc functions in the body in three areas: catalytic, structural, and regulatory. Zinc (Zn) is only common in its +2 oxidative state, where it typically coordinates with tetrahedral geometry. It is important in maintaining basic cellular functions such as DNA replication, RNA transcription, cell division, and cell activations. However, having too much or too little zinc can compromise these functions.

Some 50 enzymes are dependent on zinc for their roles in catalysis. In its structural role, zinc coordinates with certain protein domains, facilitating protein folding and producing structures such as 'zinc fingers'. In its regulatory role, zinc is involved in the activity of nucleoproteins and various inflammatory cells. For example, zinc regulates the expression of metallothionein, which has multiple functions, such as intracellular zinc compartmentalization and antioxidant function. Thus zinc deficiency results in disruption of hundreds of metabolic pathways, causing numerous clinical manifestations, including impaired growth and development, and disruption of reproductive and immune function.

Pra1 (pH-regulated antigen 1) is a Candida albicans protein that scavenges host zinc.

== Diagnosis ==
Diagnosis is typically made based on clinical suspicion and a low zinc level in the blood. Any level below 70 mcg/dL (normal 70-120 mcg/dL) is considered zinc deficiency. However there is a paucity of adequate zinc biomarkers, and the most widely used indicator, plasma zinc, has poor sensitivity and specificity.Zinc deficiency could be also associated with low alkaline phosphatase since it acts a cofactor for this enzyme.

=== Classification ===
Zinc deficiency can be classified as acute, as may occur during prolonged inappropriate zinc-free total parenteral nutrition; or chronic, as may occur in dietary deficiency or inadequate absorption.

== Prevention ==
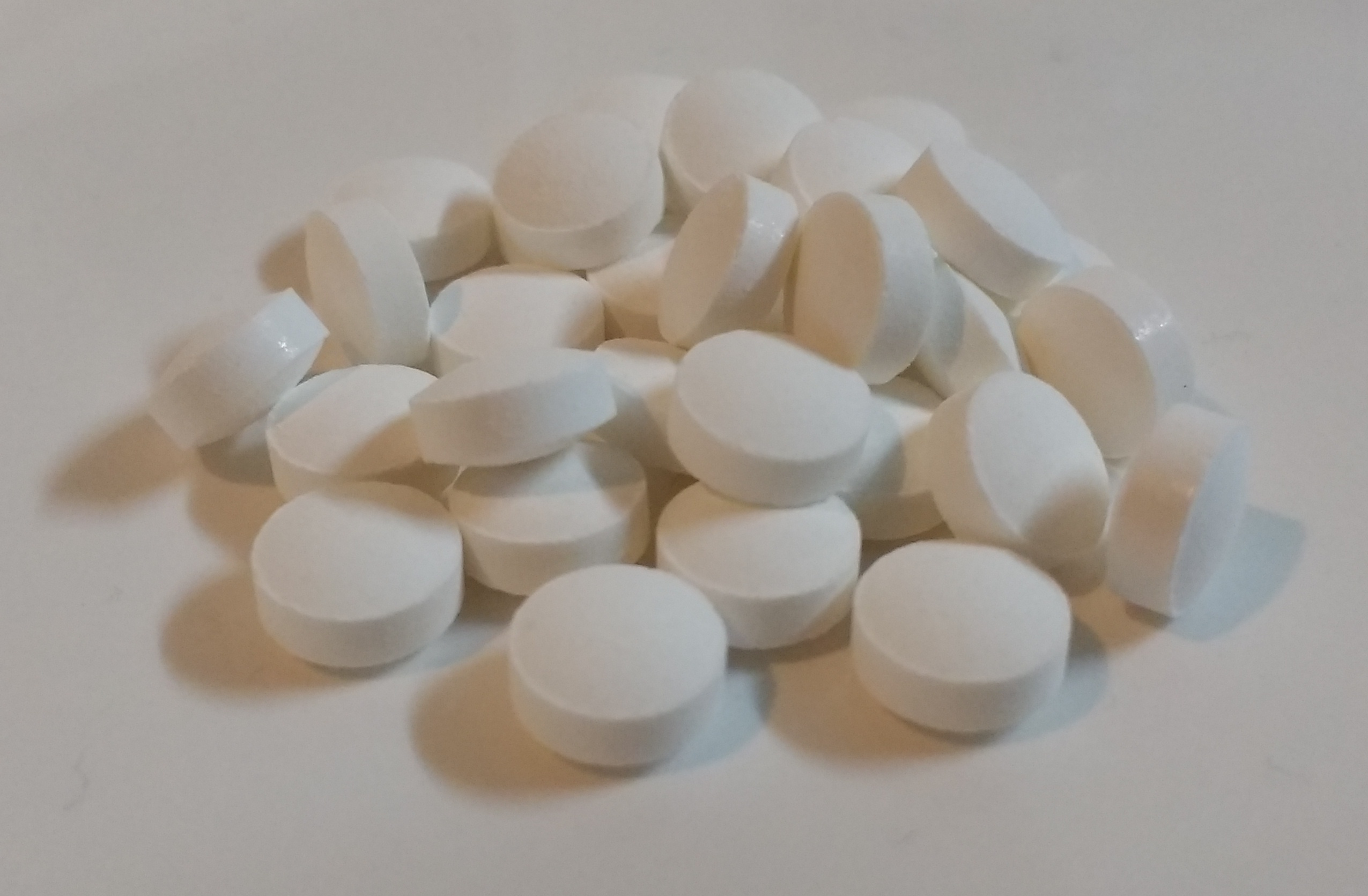
Zinc gluconate tablets

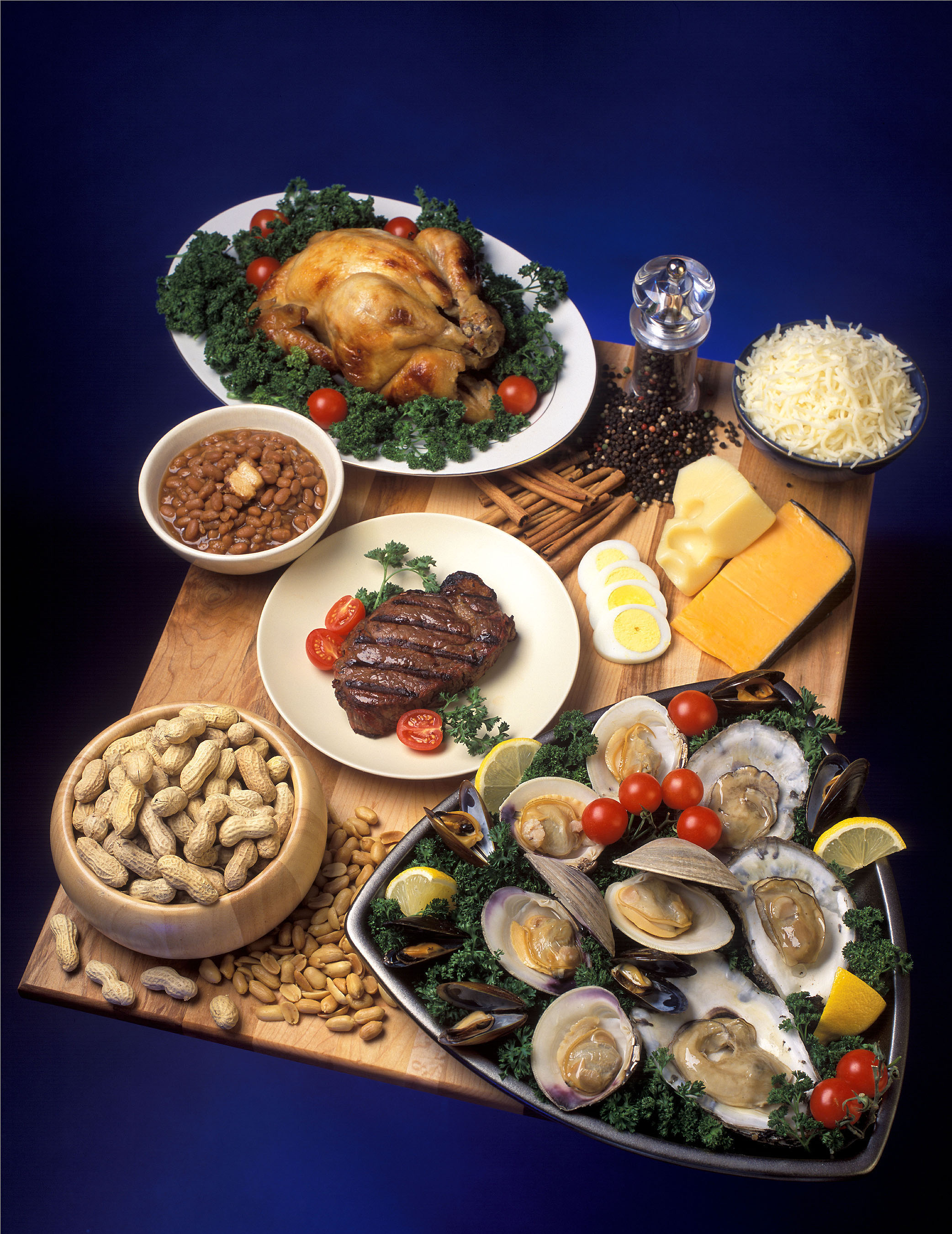
Zinc rich foods. Oysters, beef, peanuts, dark chicken meat

Five interventional strategies can be used:

- Adding zinc to soil, called agronomic biofortification, which both increases crop yields and provides more dietary zinc.
- Adding zinc to food, called food fortification. The Republic of China, India, Mexico, and about 20 other countries, mostly on the east coast of sub-Saharan Africa, fortify wheat flour and/or maize flour with zinc.
- Adding zinc-rich foods to the diet. The foods with the highest concentration of zinc are proteins, especially animal meats, the highest being oysters. Per ounce, beef, pork, and lamb contain more zinc than fish. The dark meat of a chicken has more zinc than the light meat. Other good sources of zinc are nuts, whole grains, legumes, and yeast. Although whole grains and cereals are high in zinc, they also contain chelating phytates which bind zinc and reduce its bioavailability.
- Oral repletion via tablets (e.g., zinc gluconate) or liquid (e.g., zinc acetate). Oral zinc supplementation in healthy infants more than six months old has been shown to reduce the duration of any subsequent diarrheal episodes by about 11 hours.
- Oral repletion via multivitamin/mineral supplements containing zinc gluconate, sulfate, or acetate. It is not clear whether one form is better than another.

== Epidemiology ==
Global prevalence of zinc deficiency

Zinc deficiency affects about 2.2 billion people around the world. Severe zinc deficiency is rare and is mainly seen in persons with acrodermatitis enteropathica, a severe defect in zinc absorption due to a congenital deficiency in the zinc carrier protein ZIP4 in the enterocyte.

Mild zinc deficiency due to reduced dietary intake is common. Conservative estimates suggest that 25% of the world's population is at risk of zinc deficiency.

Providing micronutrients, including zinc, to humans is one of the four solutions to major global problems identified in the Copenhagen Consensus from an international panel of economists.

== History ==
Significant historical events related to zinc deficiency began in 1869 when zinc was first discovered to be essential to the growth of an organism Aspergillus niger. In 1929 Lutz measured zinc in numerous human tissues using the dithizone technique and estimated total body zinc in a 70 kg man to be 2.2 grams. Zinc was found to be essential to the growth of rats in 1933. In 1939 beriberi patients in China were noted to have decreased zinc levels in skin and nails. In 1940 zinc levels in a series of autopsies found it to be present in all tissues examined. In 1942 a study showed most zinc excretion was via the feces. In 1950 a normal serum zinc level was first defined and found to be 17.3–22.1 micromoles/liter. In 1956 cirrhotic patients were found to have low serum zinc levels. In 1963 zinc was determined to be essential to human growth, three enzymes requiring zinc as a cofactor were described, and a report was published of a 21-year-old Iranian man with stunted growth, infantile genitalia, and anemia which were all reversed by zinc supplementation. In 1972 fifteen Iranian rejected army inductees with symptoms of zinc deficiency were reported: all responded to zinc. In 1973 the first case of acrodermatitis enteropathica due to severe zinc deficiency was described. In 1974 the National Academy of Sciences declared zinc to be an essential element for humans and established a recommended daily allowance. In 1978 the Food and Drug Administration required zinc to be in total parenteral nutrition fluids. In the 1990s there was increasing attention on the role of zinc deficiency in childhood morbidity and mortality in developing countries. In 2002 the zinc transporter protein ZIP4 was first identified as the mechanism for absorption of zinc in the gut across the basolateral membrane of the enterocyte. By 2014 over 300 zinc-containing enzymes have been identified, as well as over 1000 zinc-containing transcription factors.

Phytate was recognized as removing zinc from nutrients given to chicken and swine in 1960. That it can cause human zinc deficiency however was not recognized until Reinhold's work in Iran in the 1970s. This phenomenon is central to the high risk of zinc deficiency worldwide.

== Soils and crops ==
Soil zinc is an essential micronutrient for crops. Almost half of the world's cereal crops are deficient in zinc, leading to poor crop yields. Many agricultural countries around the world are affected by zinc deficiency. In China, zinc deficiency occurs on around half of the agricultural soils, affecting mainly rice and maize. Areas with zinc-deficient soils are often regions with widespread zinc deficiency in humans. Basic knowledge of the dynamics of zinc in soils, an understanding of the uptake and transport of zinc in crops, and characterizing the response of crops to zinc deficiency are essential steps in achieving sustainable solutions to the problem of zinc deficiency in crops and humans.

=== Biofortification ===
Soil and foliar application of zinc fertilizer can effectively increase grain zinc and reduce the phytate-to-zinc ratio in grain. People who eat bread prepared from zinc enriched wheat or fortified breakfast cereals have a significant increase in serum zinc.

Zinc fertilization not only increases zinc content in zinc-deficient crops, it also increases crop yields. Balanced crop nutrition supplying all essential nutrients, including zinc, is a cost-effective management strategy. Even with zinc-efficient varieties, zinc fertilizers are needed when the available zinc in the topsoil becomes depleted.

Plant breeding can improve the zinc uptake capacity of plants under soil conditions with low chemical availability of zinc. Breeding can also improve zinc translocation which elevates zinc content in edible crop parts as opposed to the rest of the plant.

Central Anatolia, in Turkey, was a region with zinc-deficient soils and widespread zinc deficiency in humans. In 1993, a research project found that yields could be increased by 6 to 8-fold and child nutrition dramatically increased through zinc fertilization. Zinc was added to fertilizers. While the product was initially made available at the same cost, the results were so convincing that Turkish farmers significantly increased the use of the zinc-fortified fertilizer (1 percent of zinc) within a few years, despite the repricing of the products to reflect the added value of the content. Nearly ten years after the identification of the zinc deficiency problem, the total amount of zinc-containing compound fertilizers produced and applied in Turkey reached a record level of 300,000 tonnes per annum. It is estimated that the economic benefits associated with the application of zinc fertilizers on zinc-deficient soils in Turkey is around US$100 million per year. Zinc deficiency in children has been dramatically reduced.
