= Membrane sex steroid receptor =

Membrane sex steroid receptor may refer to:

- Membrane androgen receptor
- Membrane estrogen receptor
- Membrane progesterone receptor
