= Zinc in biology =

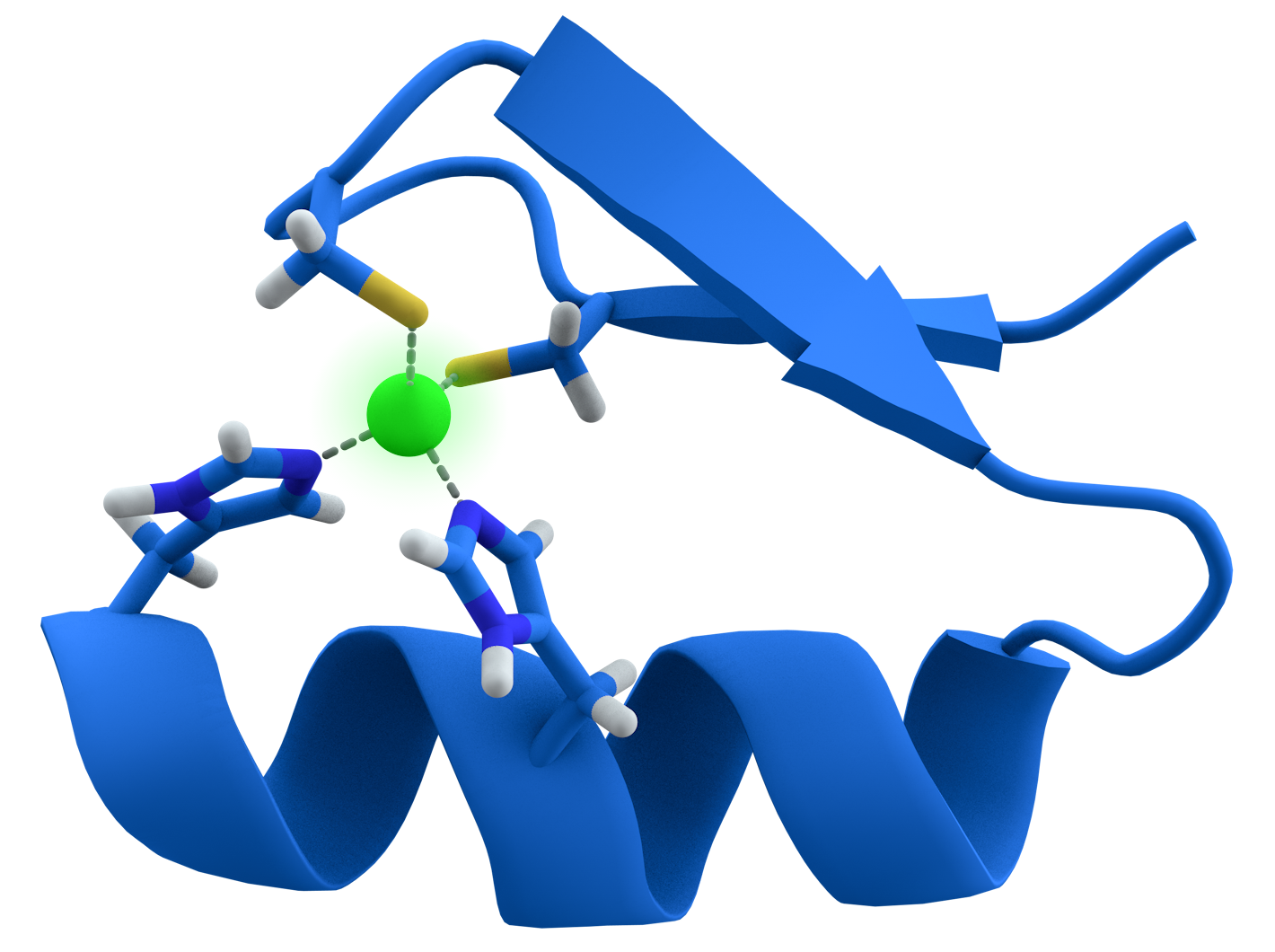
Zinc fingers help read DNA sequences.

Zinc is an essential element for all known forms of life. In humans, zinc is required for the function of over 300 enzymes and 1000 transcription factors, and is stored and transferred in metallothioneins. It is the second most abundant trace metal in humans after iron. It is the only metal which appears in all enzyme classes.

In proteins, zinc ions are often coordinated to the amino acid side chains of aspartic acid, glutamic acid, cysteine and histidine. The theoretical and computational description of this zinc binding in proteins (as well as that of other transition metals) is difficult.

Roughly 2–4 grams of zinc are distributed throughout the human body. Most zinc is in the brain, muscle, bones, kidney, and liver, with the highest concentrations in the prostate and parts of the eye. Semen contains a particularly high amount of zinc, a key factor in prostate gland function and reproductive organ growth.

Zinc homeostasis of the body is mainly controlled by the intestine. Here, ZIP4 and especially TRPM7 were linked to intestinal zinc uptake essential for postnatal survival.

In humans, the biological roles of zinc are ubiquitous. It interacts with "a wide range of organic ligands", and has roles in the metabolism of RNA and DNA, signal transduction, and gene expression. It also regulates apoptosis. A review from 2015 indicated that about 10% of human proteins (~3000) bind zinc, in addition to hundreds more that transport and traffic zinc; a similar in silico study in the plant Arabidopsis thaliana found 2367 zinc-related proteins.

In the brain, zinc is stored in specific synaptic vesicles by glutamatergic neurons and can modulate neuronal excitability. It plays a key role in synaptic plasticity and so in learning. Zinc homeostasis also plays a critical role in the functional regulation of the central nervous system. Dysregulation of zinc homeostasis in the central nervous system that results in excessive synaptic zinc concentrations is believed to induce neurotoxicity through mitochondrial oxidative stress (e.g., by disrupting certain enzymes involved in the electron transport chain, including complex I, complex III, and α-ketoglutarate dehydrogenase), the dysregulation of calcium homeostasis, glutamatergic neuronal excitotoxicity, and interference with intraneuronal signal transduction. L- and D-histidine facilitate brain zinc uptake.

SLC30A3 is the primary zinc transporter involved in cerebral zinc homeostasis.

== Enzymes ==
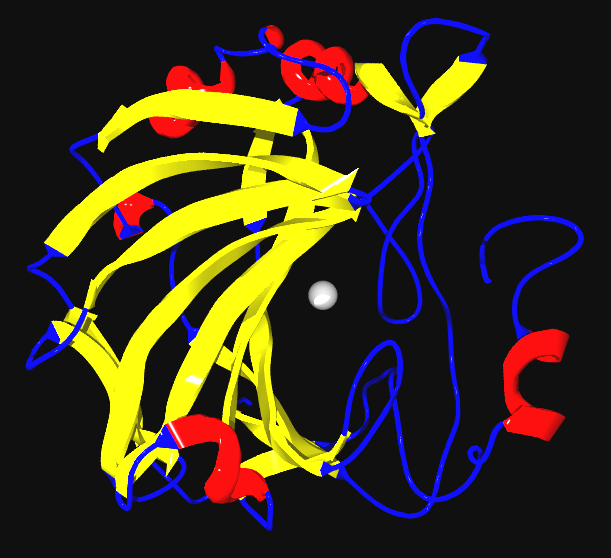
Ribbon diagram of human carbonic anhydrase II, with zinc atom visible in the center

Zinc is an efficient Lewis acid, making it a useful catalytic agent in hydroxylation and other enzymatic reactions. The metal also has a flexible coordination geometry, which allows proteins using it to rapidly shift conformations to perform biological reactions. Two examples of zinc-containing enzymes are carbonic anhydrase and carboxypeptidase, which are vital to the processes of carbon dioxide (CO_{2}) regulation and digestion of proteins, respectively.

In vertebrate blood, carbonic anhydrase converts CO_{2} into bicarbonate and the same enzyme transforms the bicarbonate back into CO_{2} for exhalation through the lungs. Without this enzyme, this conversion would occur about one million times slower at the normal blood pH of 7 or would require a pH of 10 or more. The non-related β-carbonic anhydrase is required in plants for leaf formation, the synthesis of indole acetic acid (auxin) and alcoholic fermentation.

Carboxypeptidase cleaves peptide linkages during digestion of proteins. A coordinate covalent bond is formed between the terminal peptide and a C=O group attached to zinc, which gives the carbon a positive charge. This helps to create a hydrophobic pocket on the enzyme near the zinc, which attracts the non-polar part of the protein being digested.

== Signalling ==
Zinc has been recognized as a messenger, able to activate signalling pathways. Many of these pathways provide the driving force in aberrant cancer growth. They can be targeted through ZIP transporters.

== Other proteins ==
Zinc serves a purely structural role in zinc fingers, twists and clusters. Zinc fingers form parts of some transcription factors, which are proteins that recognize DNA base sequences during the replication and transcription of DNA. Each of the nine or ten Zn^{2+} ions in a zinc finger helps maintain the finger's structure by coordinately binding to four amino acids in the transcription factor.

In blood plasma, zinc is bound to and transported by albumin (60%, low-affinity) and transferrin (10%). Because transferrin also transports iron, excessive iron reduces zinc absorption, and vice versa. A similar antagonism exists with copper. The concentration of zinc in blood plasma stays relatively constant regardless of zinc intake. Cells in the salivary gland, prostate, immune system, and intestine use zinc for cell signaling, to communicate with other cells.

Zinc may be held in metallothionein reserves within microorganisms or in the intestines or liver of animals. Metallothionein in intestinal cells is capable of adjusting absorption of zinc by 15–40%. However, inadequate or excessive zinc intake can be harmful; excess zinc particularly impairs copper absorption because metallothionein absorbs both metals.

The human dopamine transporter contains a high affinity extracellular zinc binding site which, upon zinc binding, inhibits dopamine reuptake and amplifies amphetamine-induced dopamine efflux in vitro. The human serotonin transporter and norepinephrine transporter do not contain zinc binding sites. Some EF-hand calcium binding proteins such as S100 or NCS-1 are also able to bind zinc ions.

== Nutrition ==
=== Dietary recommendations ===
The U.S. Institute of Medicine (IOM) updated Estimated Average Requirements (EARs) and Recommended Dietary Allowances (RDAs) for zinc in 2001. The current EARs for zinc for women and men ages 14 and up is 6.8 and 9.4 mg/day, respectively. The RDAs are 8 and 11 mg/day. RDAs are higher than EARs so as to identify amounts that will cover people with higher-than-average requirements. RDA for pregnancy is 11 mg/day. RDA for lactation is 12 mg/day. For infants up to 12 months, the RDA is 3 mg/day. For children ages 1–13 years, the RDA increases with age from 3 to 8 mg/day. As for safety, the IOM sets Tolerable upper intake levels (ULs) for vitamins and minerals when evidence is sufficient. In the case of zinc the adult UL is 40 mg/day (lower for children). Collectively the EARs, RDAs, AIs and ULs are referred to as Dietary Reference Intakes (DRIs).

The European Food Safety Authority (EFSA) refers to the collective set of information as Dietary Reference Values, with Population Reference Intake (PRI) instead of RDA, and Average Requirement instead of EAR. AI and UL are defined the same as in the United States. For people ages 18 and older, the PRI calculations are complex, as the EFSA has set higher and higher values as the phytate content of the diet increases. For women, PRIs increase from 7.5 to 12.7 mg/day as phytate intake increases from 300 to 1200 mg/day; for men, the range is 9.4 to 16.3 mg/day. These PRIs are higher than the U.S. RDAs. The EFSA reviewed the same safety question and set its UL at 25 mg/day, which is much lower than the U.S. value.

For U.S. food and dietary supplement labeling purposes, the amount in a serving is expressed as a percent of Daily Value (%DV). For zinc labeling purposes, 100% of the Daily Value was 15 mg, but on May 27, 2016, it was revised to 11 mg. A table of the old and new adult daily values is provided at Reference Daily Intake.

=== Dietary intake ===
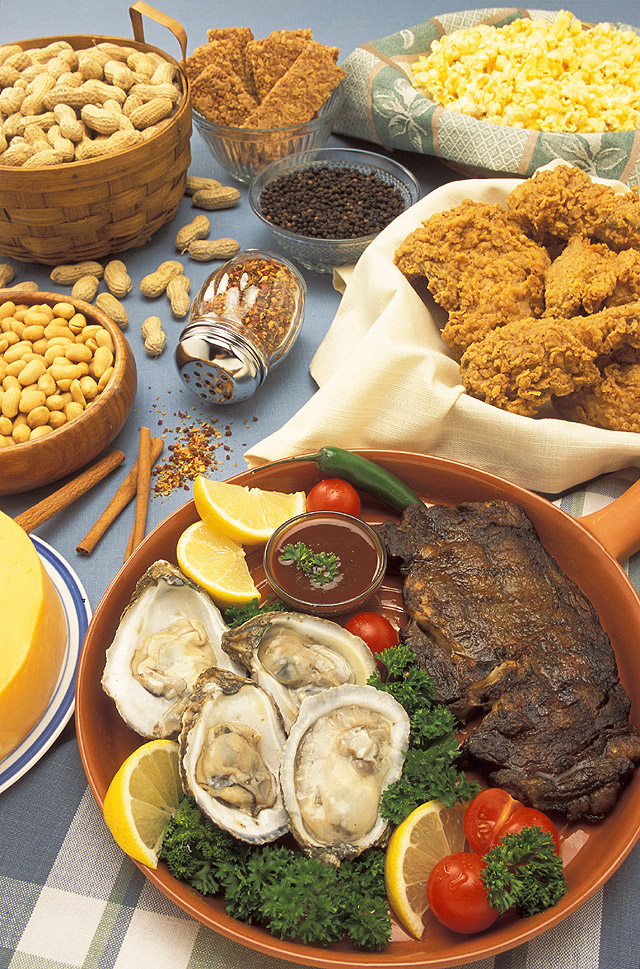
Foods and spices containing zinc

Animal products such as meat, fish, shellfish, fowl, eggs, and dairy contain zinc. The concentration of zinc in plants varies with the level in the soil. With adequate zinc in the soil, the food plants that contain the most zinc are wheat (germ and bran) and various seeds, including sesame, poppy, alfalfa, celery, and mustard. Zinc is also found in beans, nuts, almonds, whole grains, pumpkin seeds, sunflower seeds, and blackcurrant.

Other sources include fortified food and dietary supplements in various forms. A 1998 review concluded that zinc oxide, one of the most common supplements in the United States, and zinc carbonate are nearly insoluble and poorly absorbed in the body. This review cited studies that found lower plasma zinc concentrations in the subjects who consumed zinc oxide and zinc carbonate than in those who took zinc acetate and sulfate salts. For fortification, however, a 2003 review recommended cereals (containing zinc oxide) as a cheap, stable source that is as easily absorbed as the more expensive forms. A 2005 study found that various compounds of zinc, including oxide and sulfate, did not show statistically significant differences in absorption when added as fortificants to maize tortillas.

== Deficiency ==
Nearly two billion people in the developing world are deficient in zinc. Groups at risk include children in developing countries and the elderly with chronic illnesses. In children, it causes an increase in infection and diarrhea and contributes to the death of about 800,000 children worldwide per year. The World Health Organization advocates zinc supplementation for severe malnutrition and diarrhea. Zinc supplements help prevent disease and reduce mortality, especially among children with low birth weight or stunted growth. However, zinc supplements should not be administered alone, because many in the developing world have several deficiencies, and zinc interacts with other micronutrients. While zinc deficiency is usually due to insufficient dietary intake, it can be associated with malabsorption, acrodermatitis enteropathica, chronic liver disease, chronic renal disease, sickle cell disease, diabetes, malignancy, and other chronic illnesses.

In the United States, a federal survey of food consumption determined that for women and men over the age of 19, average consumption was 9.7 and 14.2 mg/day, respectively. For women, 17% consumed less than the EAR, for men 11%. The percentages below EAR increased with age. The most recent published update of the survey (NHANES 2013–2014) reported lower averages – 9.3 and 13.2 mg/day – again with intake decreasing with age.

Symptoms of mild zinc deficiency are diverse. Clinical outcomes include depressed growth, diarrhea, impotence and delayed sexual maturation, alopecia, eye and skin lesions, impaired appetite, altered cognition, impaired immune functions, defects in carbohydrate utilization, and reproductive teratogenesis. Zinc deficiency depresses immunity, but excessive zinc does also.

Despite some concerns, western vegetarians and vegans do not suffer any more from overt zinc deficiency than meat-eaters. Major plant sources of zinc include cooked dried beans, sea vegetables, fortified cereals, soy foods, nuts, peas, and seeds. However, phytates in many whole-grains and fibers may interfere with zinc absorption and marginal zinc intake has poorly understood effects. The zinc chelator phytate, found in seeds and cereal bran, can contribute to zinc malabsorption. Some evidence suggests that more than the US RDA (8 mg/day for adult women; 11 mg/day for adult men) may be needed in those whose diet is high in phytates, such as some vegetarians. The European Food Safety Authority (EFSA) guidelines attempt to compensate for this by recommending higher zinc intake when dietary phytate intake is greater. These considerations must be balanced against the paucity of adequate zinc biomarkers, and the most widely used indicator, plasma zinc, has poor sensitivity and specificity.

== Soil availability and remediation ==
Zinc can be present in six different forms in soil namely; water soluble zinc, exchangeable zinc, organically bound zinc, carbonate bound zinc, aluminium and manganese oxide bound zinc and residual fractions of zinc.

In toxic conditions, species of Calluna, Erica and Vaccinium can grow in zinc-metalliferous soils, because translocation of toxic ions is prevented by the action of ericoid mycorrhizal fungi.

== Agriculture ==
Zinc deficiency appears to be the most common micronutrient deficiency in crop plants; it is particularly common in high-pH soils. Zinc-deficient soil is cultivated in the cropland of about half of Turkey and India, a third of China, and most of Western Australia. Substantial responses to zinc fertilization have been reported in these areas. Plants that grow in soils that are zinc-deficient are more susceptible to disease. Zinc is added to the soil primarily through the weathering of rocks, but humans have added zinc through fossil fuel combustion, mine waste, phosphate fertilizers, pesticide (zinc phosphide), limestone, manure, sewage sludge, and particles from galvanized surfaces. Excess zinc is toxic to plants, although zinc toxicity is far less widespread.

== Biodegradable implants ==
Zinc (Zn), alongside magnesium (Mg) and iron (Fe), constitutes one of the three families of biodegradable metals. Zinc, as an abundant trace element, ranks sixth among all the essential metallic elements crucial for sustaining life within the human body. Zinc exhibits an intermediate biodegradation rate, falling between that of Fe (relatively slow) and Mg (relatively high) which positions it as a promising material for use in biodegradable implants.

== Bibliography ==
- Cotton FA, Wilkinson G, Murillo CA, Bochmann M (1999). Advanced Inorganic Chemistry (6th ed.). New York: John Wiley & Sons. ISBN 978-0-471-19957-1.
- Greenwood NN, Earnshaw A (1997). Chemistry of the Elements (2nd ed.). Oxford: Butterworth-Heinemann. ISBN 978-0-7506-3365-9.
