= Zinc transporter ZIP8 =

Protein found in humans

SLC39A8

Identifiers
- Aliases: SLC39A8, BIGM103, LZT-Hs6, ZIP8, PP3105, CDG2N, solute carrier family 39 member 8
- External IDs: OMIM: 608732; MGI: 1914797; GeneCards: SLC39A8

Gene location (Human)
Chr.	Chromosome 4 (human)
Band	4q24	Start	102,251,080 bp
Band	4q24	End	102,431,258 bp

Gene location (Mouse)
Chr.	Chromosome 3 (mouse)
Band	3 G3|3 63.04 cM	Start	135,531,040 bp
Band	3 G3|3 63.04 cM	End	135,594,333 bp
RNA expression pattern
Bgee	Human / Mouse (ortholog); Top expressed in: parotid gland; lower lobe of lung; visceral pleura; germinal epithelium; upper lobe of lung; parietal pleura; upper lobe of left lung; right lung; mucosa of sigmoid colon; rectum / Top expressed in: molar; right lung lobe; left lung; left lung lobe; hair follicle; conjunctival fornix; yolk sac; umbilical cord; primitive streak; fetal liver hematopoietic progenitor cell; More reference expression data
BioGPS	n/a
Gene ontology
Molecular function	metal ion transmembrane transporter activity; zinc ion transmembrane transporter activity
Cellular component	organelle membrane; integral component of membrane; plasma membrane; membrane; integral component of plasma membrane
Biological process	metal ion transport; zinc ion transport; ion transport; cadmium ion transmembrane transport; cellular zinc ion homeostasis; zinc ion import across plasma membrane; transmembrane transport
Sources:Amigo / QuickGO
Orthologs
Databases	NCBI: entry; OMA: entry
Species	Human	Mouse
Entrez	64116	67547
Ensembl	ENSG00000138821	ENSMUSG00000053897
UniProt	Q9C0K1	Q91W10
RefSeq (mRNA)	NM_001135146; NM_001135147; NM_001135148; NM_022154	NM_001135149; NM_001135150; NM_026228
RefSeq (protein)	NP_001128618; NP_001128619; NP_001128620; NP_071437	NP_001128621; NP_001128622; NP_080504
Location (UCSC)	Chr 4: 102.25 – 102.43 Mb	Chr 3: 135.53 – 135.59 Mb
PubMed search
- Wikidata
View/Edit Human	View/Edit Mouse

Zinc transporter ZIP8 is a cation/bicarbonate symporter protein which in humans is encoded by the SLC39A8 gene.

== Function ==
This transmembrane protein is responsible for the influx of zinc, manganese, and cadmium. ZIP8 is distributed among the embryo, placenta, and yolk sac during development. Within the embryo, the concentration of ZIP8 is highest during the developmental period of different organ systems, specifically the heart where is it localized in the endothelial cells. Cardiac development is a zinc-dependent event. Beginning around mouse E8.0, the heart is in a tubular form with an outer myocardium layer and an inner endocardium layer, separated by cardiac jelly. As development continues, trabeculation, the protrusion of cardiomyocytes into the cardiac jelly, begins and facilitates nutrient and oxygen exchange prior to the establishment of coronary vessels. Simultaneous with coronary circulation development, the trabeculae then collapse into the ventricular wall in a process known as compaction. Cardiomyocyte differentiation, proliferation, and trabeculae patterning is regulated through Notch 1 signaling, which is upregulated by the ECM. ADAMTS 1, 5, 7, 15, and 19 are zinc metalloenzymes responsible for degrading the ECM prior to compaction. Many studies have analyzed the effects of Slc39a8-/- on fetal heart development and have shown a decrease in zinc influx leading to an increase in cardiomyocyte proliferation through BMP10, hypertrabeculation through the upregulation of Notch1, and ventricular non-compaction due to the persistence of the ECM.
