= Zinc transporter ZIP13 =

Protein-coding gene in humans

An Error has occurred retrieving Wikidata item for infobox SLC39A13, also known as ZIP13, is a protein-coding gene in humans that encodes a zinc transporter in the solute carrier family 39. ZIP13 is involved in intracellular zinc homeostasis and zinc ion transport, especially within the Golgi apparatus and endoplasmic reticulum. Pathogenic variants in SLC39A13 are associated with Spondylodysplastic Ehlers–Danlos syndrome type 3, also known as EDSSPD3 or SCD-EDS.

== Gene ==
The human SLC39A13 gene is located on chromosome 11 at position 11p11.2. The gene encodes zinc transporter ZIP13, a member of the LIV-1 subfamily of ZIP zinc transporters. Gene Ontology annotations associate SLC39A13 with connective tissue development, intracellular zinc ion homeostasis, and zinc ion transmembrane transport.

== Transcripts ==
SLC39A13 has multiple transcript variants listed in NCBI and related genome databases. The primary human protein-coding transcript encodes ZIP13, a 371 amino acid protein.

== Protein ==
ZIP13 is 371 amino acids long and has a predicted molecular weight of approximately 42 kDa. The protein has an isoelectric point of approximately 5.31, making it acidic. Amino acid composition analysis indicates that ZIP13 is leucine-rich, which is consistent with its multiple hydrophobic transmembrane regions.

=== Secondary and tertiary structure ===
ZIP13 contains a conserved ZIP zinc transporter domain spanning much of the protein sequence. UniProt predicts that ZIP13 contains eight transmembrane helices separated by alternating cytoplasmic and lumenal loops. A conserved HExxH-like motif is present in the protein and may contribute to metal binding and zinc transport activity.

== Gene level regulation ==
=== Promoter ===
The promoter and 5′ untranslated region of SLC39A13 contain multiple predicted transcription factor binding sites and naturally occurring genetic variants. This suggests that multiple transcription factors may control SLC39A13 expression and may vary across tissues or individuals.

=== Expression ===
SLC39A13 is broadly expressed across human tissues, consistent with its role in intracellular zinc regulation and basic cellular function. Expression data and Gene Ontology annotations support a role for ZIP13 in connective tissue development and intracellular zinc homeostasis.

Predicted transcription factors associated with the SLC39A13 promoter
| Code | Full Name | Matrix Accession | Primary Function |
|---|---|---|---|
| PRDM9 | PR/SET Domain 9 | MA1723.2 | Meiotic recombination |
| SPI1 | Spi-1 proto-oncogene | MA0080.7 | Hematopoietic gene regulation |
| SP3 | Specificity Protein 3 | MA0746.3 | GC-rich promoter binding |
| SPIB | Spi-B transcription factor | MA0081.3 | Immune cell regulation |
| KLF5 | Krüppel-like factor 5 | MA0599.1 | Cell growth and differentiation |
| ZBED4 | Zinc Finger BED-Type Containing 4 | MA2328.1 | DNA/RNA binding |
| ZNF213 | Zinc Finger Protein 213 | MA2121.1 | Transcriptional regulation |
| ATF6 | Activating Transcription Factor 6 | MA1466.2 | ER stress response |
| CREB3L4 | cAMP Responsive Element-Binding Protein 3-Like 4 | MA1474.2 | ER-associated transcription |
| PATZ1 | POZ/BTB and AT Hook Containing Zinc Finger 1 | MA1961.2 | Chromatin remodeling |
| ZKSCAN5 | Zinc Finger Protein with KRAB and SCAN Domains 5 | MA1652.2 | Transcriptional activation |
| ETV7 | ETS Variant Transcription Factor 7 | MA1708.2 | Hematopoietic regulation |
| KLF9 | Krüppel-like Factor 9 | MA1107.3 | Developmental regulation |
| FEZF2 | FEZ Family Zinc Finger 2 | MA2341.1 | Neurodevelopment |
| CTCF | CCCTC-Binding Factor | MA0139.2 | Genome organization |

== Transcript level regulation ==
The 5′ and 3′ untranslated regions of SLC39A13 may contribute to transcript regulation. Predicted microRNA binding sites and conserved sequence regions in the untranslated regions suggest possible regulation of mRNA stability or translation efficiency.

== Protein level regulation ==
=== Modification ===
PhosphoSitePlus reports experimentally identified post-translational modification sites in human ZIP13, including phosphorylation sites near the N-terminus and a ubiquitination site within the ZIP transporter region. These modifications may influence transporter activity, localization, or protein stability.

=== Subcellular localization ===
ZIP13 is primarily associated with intracellular membranes, especially the Golgi apparatus and endoplasmic reticulum membrane. This localization supports its role in regulating zinc distribution within the secretory pathway.

== Evolution ==
=== Paralog ===
SLC39A13 belongs to the solute carrier family 39 zinc transporter family, which includes several related ZIP proteins. Paralogs such as SLC39A7, SLC39A8, SLC39A14, and other ZIP family members share zinc transporter-related functions.

=== Orthologs ===
Orthologs of SLC39A13 are found across vertebrates and other animal lineages, suggesting that ZIP13 is evolutionarily conserved. Conservation of the ZIP domain and transmembrane regions suggests that these protein regions are important for zinc transport function.

Representative SLC39A13 orthologs used for evolutionary analysis
| Species | Common Name | Taxonomic Group | Divergence (MYA) | Accession Number | Length (aa) | Identity | Similarity |
|---|---|---|---|---|---|---|---|
| Homo sapiens | Human | Primata | 0 | NP_001121697 | 371 | 100% | 100% |
| Pongo pygmaeus | Bornean orangutan | Primata | 15 | XP_063526983 | 389 | 99.4% | 99.0% |
| Saccopteryx leptura | Lesser sac-winged bat | Mammalia | 94 | XP_066217671 | 364 | 87.4% | 91.0% |
| Puma concolor | Cougar | Mammalia | 94 | XP_025784361 | 371 | 92.7% | 94.0% |
| Nannospalax galili | Blind mole rat | Mammalia | 87 | XP_029424430 | 382 | 86.7% | 90.0% |
| Heliangelus exortis | Tourmaline sunangel | Aves | 319 | XP_071601025 | 367 | 66.0% | 74.0% |
| Chelonoidis abingdonii | Pinta Island tortoise | Reptilia | 319 | XP_032649326 | 369 | 64.5% | 72.0% |
| Heteronotia binoei | Bynoe's gecko | Reptilia | 319 | XP_060118647 | 361 | 62.8% | 71.0% |
| Ascaphus truei | Coastal tailed frog | Amphibia | 352 | XP_075423582 | 394 | 70.0% | 79.0% |
| Lissotriton helveticus | Palmate newt | Amphibia | 352 | XP_078540618 | 368 | 61.2% | 72.0% |
| Salmo salar | Atlantic salmon | Vertebrata | 429 | XP_013984674 | 424 | 53.5% | 62.0% |
| Danio rerio | Zebrafish | Vertebrata | 429 | NP_001005306 | 389 | 58.4% | 71.0% |
| Heterodontus francisci | Horn shark | Vertebrata | 462 | XP_067902006 | 473 | 55.3% | 68.0% |
| Ciona intestinalis | Sea squirt | Chordata | 596 | XP_078487999 | 417 | 43.4% | 58.0% |

== Interacting proteins ==
STRING analysis suggests that ZIP13 is functionally associated with other zinc transporters, including members of the ZIP and ZnT transporter families. These interactions support the role of ZIP13 as part of a broader zinc homeostasis network. Experimental studies have also identified VCP as a protein involved in the degradation of pathogenic ZIP13 mutants.

== Clinical significance ==
Pathogenic variants in SLC39A13 cause spondylodysplastic Ehlers–Danlos syndrome type 3, an autosomal recessive connective tissue disorder characterized by short stature, skeletal abnormalities, thin wrinkled skin, joint hypermobility, and dental abnormalities. A reported missense variant, Gly74Asp, occurs within a transmembrane region of ZIP13 and has been associated with disease. Disease-associated ZIP13 variants may be degraded by the cell’s protein quality-control machinery, leading to impaired zinc homeostasis.

== Therapeutic research ==
Research on pathogenic ZIP13 mutants suggests that some disease-causing proteins are recognized as defective and degraded before they can function. Inhibiting protein quality-control factors such as VCP and HSP90 has been shown experimentally to increase mutant ZIP13 protein levels and partially restore intracellular zinc homeostasis. This suggests that future therapies for SLC39A13-related Ehlers–Danlos syndrome could focus on stabilizing mutant ZIP13 protein rather than directly correcting the DNA mutation.
