= Catecholamines up =

Dopamine regulatory membrane protein

Identifiers
- Organism: Drosophila melanogaster (Fruit fly)
- Symbol: Catsup
- Entrez: 48805
- Orthologs: NCBI: entry; OMA: entry
- RefSeq (mRNA): NM_080192
- RefSeq (Prot): NP_524931
- UniProt: Q9V3A4
Search for
- Structures: Swiss-model
- Domains: InterPro

Catecholamines up (Catsup) is a dopamine regulatory membrane protein that functions as a zinc ion transmembrane transporter (orthologous to ZIP7), and a negative regulator of rate-limiting enzymes involved in dopamine synthesis and transport: Tyrosine hydroxylase (TH), GTP Cyclohydrolase I (GTPCH), and Vesicular Monoamine Transporter (VMAT) in Drosophila melanogaster.

Catsup plays a significant role in zinc ion transmembrane transport, and the mutations in Catsup gene can lead to abnormal accumulation of membrane proteins, such as Notch, decreased Notch signalling, increase in levels of apoptosis, and induce of ER stress response. Additionally, Catsup plays an important role in regulation of dopamine synthesis, and the mutations in Catsup gene can lead to hyperactivity of Catsup-regulated enzymes TH, GTPCH, and VMAT, as well as to increases in dopamine (DA) and tetrahydrobiopterin (BH_{4}) levels.

== Gene structure and function ==
Catsup is a pleiotropic quantitative trait gene that encodes a negative regulator of dopamine (DA) and tetrahydrobiopterin (BH_{4}) synthesis, as well as synaptic vesicle uptake in Drosophila melanogaster. In dopamine synthesis, Catsup functions to inhibit Tyrosine hydroxylase (TH), GTP Cyclohydrolase I (GTPCH), and Vesicular Monoamine Transporter (VMAT) enzyme activity. Various molecular polymorphisms of Catsup are associated with variations in quantitative traits, such as locomotor behavior, lifespan, and sensory bristle number. Catsup protein is composed of seven transmembrane helices that induce post-translational modification of both enzymes TH and GTPCH, and two conserved extracellular ZIP Zinc transporter domains that possess zinc ion transmembrane transport activity.

Catsup co-localizes with enzymes TH and VMAT to dopaminergic neuron cell bodies and synaptic termini. Additionally, Catsup gene encodes Drosophila ortholog to ZIP7 zinc transporter protein, which is part of ZIP (Zrt/Irt-like protein) family in mammals.

== Role in regulation of dopamine biosynthesis ==
Catsup regulates production of dopamine by serving as a negative regulator of rate-limiting enzymes in dopamine and pteridine synthesis pathways, both of which are required to occur for production of dopamine.

In dopamine synthesis pathway, Catsup negatively regulates Tyrosine hydroxylase (TH) activity, preventing TH catalyzed conversion of tyrosine to the precursor of dopamine, L-Dopa.

In pteridine biosynthesis pathway, Catsup negatively regulates the activity of GTP Cyclohydrolase I (GTPCH), preventing GTPCH catalyzed biosynthesis of TH cofactor required for TH catalytic activity and regulation, tetrahydrobiopterin (BH4).

== Role in zinc ion transmembrane transport ==
Catsup gene encodes Drosophila ortholog to ZIP7 zinc transporter protein in mammals, which controls zinc homeostasis and maintains concentrations of free zinc low in cells. Zinc transporters allow zinc transport into the cytoplasm of the cell, and disruptions to zinc transporters can lead to neurodevelopmental damages.

== Mutations ==
As the zinc ion transmembrane transporter, Catsup mutations can lead to abnormal accumulation of membrane proteins, such as Notch, decreased Notch signalling, increase in levels of apoptosis, and induce of ER stress response.

As the regulator of dopamine biosynthesis, Catsup mutations can lead to hyperactivity of Catsup-regulated enzymes TH, GTPCH, and VMAT, as well as to increases in dopamine (DA) and tetrahydrobiopterin (BH_{4}) levels.
