= Membrane androgen receptor =

Membrane androgen receptors (mARs) are a type of receptor located in the cell membrane that bind to and are activated by testosterone and/or other androgens. These types of receptors cause a more rapid response than the classical androgen receptor (AR), which is a nuclear receptor which mediates its effects via genomic mechanisms. The details of the receptors that cause this observed rapid response are not fully understood, but some G protein-coupled receptors (GPCRs) like ZIP9 appear to be function in this way. Other potential candidates have been put forward but are more controversial, including TRPM8, OXER1, and GPRC6A. The adhesion receptor ADGRD1 (or GPR133) has also recently been proposed to function as an androgen membrane receptor, specifically for 5α-dihydrotestosterone (5α-DHT). In addition, two alternative splicings of AR (AR8 and AR45) have been found on the cell membrane, and so may also play a part in membrane androgen signaling.

== Putative examples ==
GPRC6A has been found to be involved in testicular function and prostate cancer. mARs have also been found to be expressed in breast cancer cells. Activation of mARs by testosterone has been found to increase skeletal muscle strength, indicating potential anabolic effects. mARs have also been implicated in the antigonadotropic effects of androgens. 3α-Androstanediol, an active metabolite of dihydrotestosterone (DHT) and a weak androgen as well as a neurosteroid via acting as a positive allosteric modulator of the GABA_{A} receptor, rapidly influences sexual receptivity and behavior in animals, an effect that is GABA_{A} receptor-dependent.

GPR133 binds androgens, specifically the androgen 5α-dihydrotestosterone (5α-DHT). GPR133 is an adhesion G protein-coupled receptor that may function as a membrane receptor for androgens. When activated by 5α-DHT, GPR133 increases intracellular cyclic AMP (cAMP) levels in muscle cells, leading to enhanced muscle strength.

== See also ==
- Membrane steroid receptor
