= GL64 =

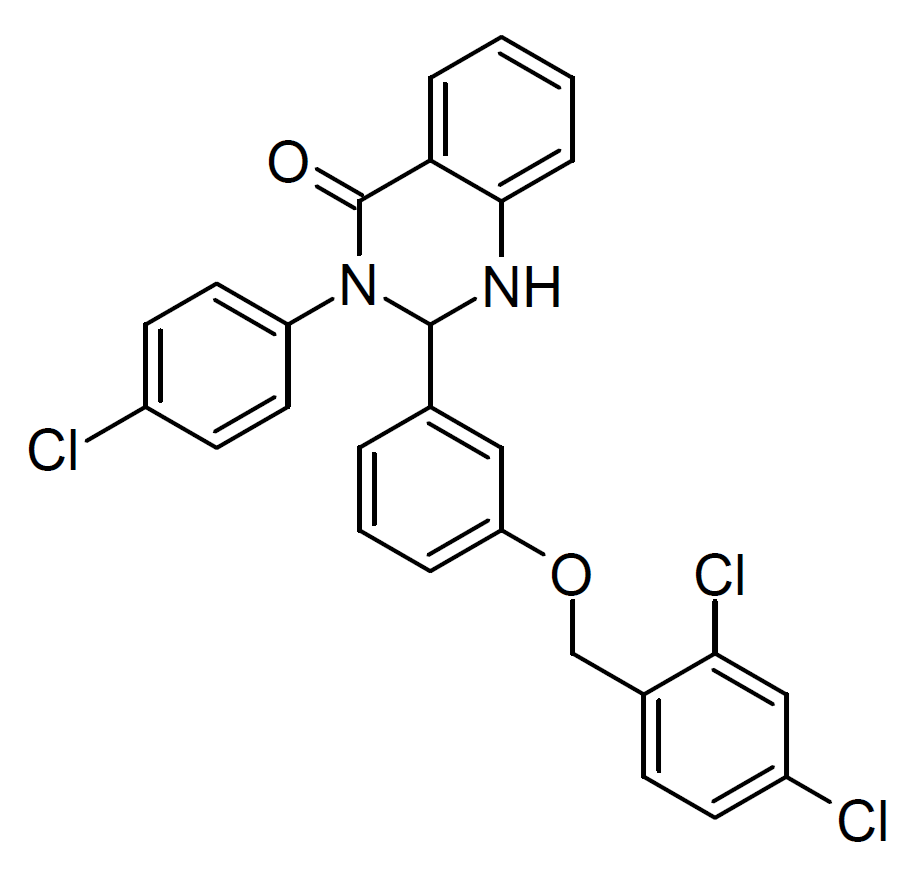

Identifiers
- IUPAC name: 3-(4-chlorophenyl)-2-[3-[(2,4-dichlorophenyl)methoxy]phenyl]-1,2-dihydroquinazolin-4-one
- CAS Number: 488801-10-1
- PubChem CID: 3693275
- ChemSpider: 2925337

Chemical and physical data
- Formula: C_{27}H_{19}Cl_{3}N_{2}O_{2}
- Molar mass: 509.81 g·mol^{−1}
- 3D model (JSmol): Interactive image
- SMILES: C1=CC=C2C(=C1)C(=O)N(C(N2)C3=CC(=CC=C3)OCC4=C(C=C(C=C4)Cl)Cl)C5=CC=C(C=C5)Cl
- InChI: InChI=1S/C27H19Cl3N2O2/c28-19-10-12-21(13-11-19)32-26(31-25-7-2-1-6-23(25)27(32)33)17-4-3-5-22(14-17)34-16-18-8-9-20(29)15-24(18)30/h1-15,26,31H,16H2; Key:OPKSEEXRWAXFIK-UHFFFAOYSA-N

GL64 is a chemical compound which acts as an agonist at the androgen receptor GPR133. It increases bone density by inhibiting osteoclastogenesis, and shows beneficial effects in an animal model of osteoporosis.

== See also ==
- AP503
