= Zinc transporter ZIP12 =

Protein found in humans

SLC39A12

Identifiers
- Aliases: SLC39A12, LZT-Hs8, ZIP-12, bA570F3.1, solute carrier family 39 member 12, ZIP12
- External IDs: OMIM: 608734; MGI: 2139274; GeneCards: SLC39A12

Gene location (Mouse)
Chr.	Chromosome 2 (mouse)
Band	2|2 A2	Start	14,393,127 bp
Band	2|2 A2	End	14,499,788 bp
RNA expression pattern
Bgee	Human / Mouse (ortholog); Top expressed in: retinal pigment epithelium; secondary oocyte; cerebellar vermis; external globus pallidus; putamen; entorhinal cortex; Brodmann area 9; amygdala; hippocampus proper; superior frontal gyrus / Top expressed in: Epithelium of choroid plexus; lumbar subsegment of spinal cord; deep cerebellar nuclei; suprachiasmatic nucleus; medial vestibular nucleus; retinal pigment epithelium; dorsal tegmental nucleus; inferior colliculi; superior colliculus; mammillary body; More reference expression data
BioGPS	n/a
Gene ontology
Molecular function	metal ion transmembrane transporter activity; zinc ion transmembrane transporter activity
Cellular component	perinuclear region of cytoplasm; integral component of membrane; extracellular vesicle; plasma membrane; membrane; integral component of plasma membrane
Biological process	metal ion transport; zinc ion transport; ion transport; regulation of neuron projection development; regulation of microtubule polymerization; transmembrane transport; cellular zinc ion homeostasis; signal transduction; zinc ion import across plasma membrane; transport
Sources:Amigo / QuickGO
Orthologs
Databases	NCBI: entry
Species	Human	Mouse
Entrez	221074	277468
Ensembl	n/a	ENSMUSG00000036949
UniProt	Q504Y0	Q5FWH7
RefSeq (mRNA)	NM_152725; NM_001145195; NM_001282733; NM_001282734	NM_001012305
RefSeq (protein)	NP_001138667; NP_001269662; NP_001269663; NP_689938	NP_001012305
Location (UCSC)	n/a	Chr 2: 14.39 – 14.5 Mb
PubMed search
- Wikidata
View/Edit Human	View/Edit Mouse

Solute carrier family 39 member 12 is a protein that in humans is encoded by the SLC39A12 gene.

== Function ==
Zinc is an essential cofactor for hundreds of enzymes. It is involved in protein, nucleic acid, carbohydrate, and lipid metabolism, as well as in the control of gene transcription, growth, development, and differentiation. ZIP12 belongs to a subfamily of proteins that show structural characteristics of zinc transporters.

== Basic properties ==
Zinc transporter ZIP12 is a protein that is encoded by the solute carrier 39 member 12 (SLC39A12) gene. ZIP12 is part of a family of Zrt-like, IRT-like proteins (ZIPs) that transport metals. ZIP12 is most closely related to a similar transporter, ZIP4, which is mutated in the genetic disorder acrodermatitis enteropathica. Human ZIP12 shares 31 percent of its amino acids with human ZIP4 between their conserved regions. There are two main splice variants of ZIP12 in humans, which are 691 and 654 amino acids long. The difference in the lengths of these 2 variants of ZIP12 are due to the inclusion or exclusion of an in-frame exon.

The ZIP12 protein contains many elements that are conserved across other ZIP transporters in vertebrates (including mammals and humans). ZIP12 has eight transmembrane domains and contains histidine residues within transmembrane regions four and five that are believed to be necessary for zinc transport across cellular membranes. ZIP12 is present at the plasma membrane and can transport zinc ions from the outside of the cell to the inside.

The SLC39A12 gene is conserved across vertebrates, including humans, non-human primates like rhesus monkeys, cats, dogs, rodents including rats and mice, birds such as chickens, and frogs such as Xenopus laevis and Xenopus tropicalis. The SLC39A12 gene is present in some fish such as Japanese medaka, Nile tilapia, and European seabass, but the SLC39A12 gene is not present in zebrafish. ZIP12 has been shown to transport zinc, and there is currently no evidence that ZIP12 can transport metals other than zinc. ZIP12 is expressed in many tissues and is particularly high in the brain and eye. In mice, ZIP12 mRNA is not detected in pancreas.

== Role in neurite extension and mitochondria in mouse neural cells ==
In mouse Neuro-2a cells and primary mouse neurons, ZIP12 is necessary for neurite extension. Neurites are projections from the cell body of a neural cell during differentiation, and neurites can refer to either axons or dendrites. To study how ZIP12 is important for a neural cell to extend neurites out from the cell body, researchers used short hairpin RNA (shRNA) to induce RNA interference to degrade ZIP12 mRNA and reduce ZIP12 protein. In Neuro-2a cells and primary mouse neurons transfected with shRNA specifically targeting ZIP12, the neural cells have shorter neurites. Increasing intracellular zinc with a zinc ionophore that can cross the cellular membrane while bypassing ZIP12 can restore neurite extension in cells with targeted ZIP12 depletion.

In a subsequent study, Neuro-2a cells with targeted ZIP12 mutations using CRISPR-mediated genome editing also have shorter neurites during differentiation and mitochondrial dysfunction. In addition, ZIP12-deleted cells have reduced cellular respiration, which is a measure of mitochondrial function. Neurite extension of Neuro-2a is more affected by rotenone and sodium azide, which are inhibitors of the electron transport chain of the mitochondria, in cells without ZIP12. ZIP12-deleted cells also have increased superoxide generation and higher oxidative damage, which are consistent with impaired mitochondrial function. Exposing ZIP12-deleted cells to antioxidants such as alpha-tocopherol (vitamin E), MitoQ, or MitoTEMPO can restore neurite length, which indicates that the oxidative damage present in cells without ZIP12 leads to stunted neurites.

== Role in early nervous system development of Xenopus tropicalis ==
ZIP12 is present in the forebrain, midbrain, and eye of Xenopus tropicalis in nervous system development. ZIP12 is also present at the anterior neuropore during closure of the neural tube. ZIP12 mRNA is concentrated in the neural tube, and ZIP12 expression is higher in the neural tube compared to the rest of the embryo. To study how ZIP12 is necessary for Xenopus tropicalis embryo development, the researchers injected embryos with antisense morpholino oligonucleotides that deplete the embryos of ZIP12. In embryos injected with morpholinos targeting the translation start site of ZIP12, the embryos have incomplete neural tube closure at the anterior neuropore, followed by embryonic death. Embryos injected with morpholinos that alter ZIP12 splicing and impair its function have slower neural tube closure, often lack eyes (called anopia), and undergo embryonic death shortly after neural tube closure.

== Impact on human brain MRI patterns ==
Genome-wide association studies (GWAS) and exome sequencing from subjects in the UK Biobank show that gene polymorphism and mutations in ZIP12 are associated with altered susceptibility weighted imaging intensity and T1 FAST magnetic resonance imaging (MRI) in the human brain. Polymorphisms (rs10430577, rs10430578) near SLC39A12 are the lead single nucleotide polymorphisms (SNPs) most associated with altered swMRI intensity in the caudate, putamen, and pallidum and T1 FAST MRI in the putamen. Susceptibility weighted magnetic resonance imaging is sensitive to metal content in the tissues analyzed. Associated missense ZIP12 mutations (rs10764176, rs72778328) have reduced zinc transport activity when measured in Chinese hamster ovary (CHO) cells. However, the impact of the changes in the human brain caused by ZIP12 polymorphisms and mutations is currently unknown.

== Role in hypoxia-induced pulmonary hypertension ==
Hypoxia induces the expression of ZIP12 in the endothelium of mammalian pulmonary vessels. The induction of ZIP12 results in the proliferation and thickening of pulmonary vascular smooth muscle cells, which leads to pulmonary hypertension. Zhao et al. identified ZIP12 as the responsible gene through congenic breeding between Fisher 344 (F344) rats, which are resistant to hypoxia-induced pulmonary hypertension, and susceptible Wistar Kyoto (WKY) rats. Resistant F344 rats crossed with non-resistant WKY rats produce subcongenic strains, and quantitative trait loci (QTL) analysis was used to determine which genes co-segregate with the hypoxic response by the pulmonary vessels and sensitivity to pulmonary hypertension. A ZIP12 frameshift mutation in F344 rats truncates the protein and reduces cellular zinc uptake by pulmonary endothelial smooth muscle cells. Additional support for ZIP12 as the responsible gene was shown when a similar resistance to hypoxia-induced pulmonary hypertension was observed in rats with targeted deletion of the SLC39A12 (ZIP12) gene by zinc finger nucleases. In addition to rats, cattle and humans also show increased ZIP12 protein when housed in hypoxic environments, which implies that response of increased ZIP12 protein to hypoxia is found across different mammals. A hypoxia response element (HRE) is present within a SLC39A12 intron, which can increase ZIP12 expression under hypoxic conditions. In a separate study using human vascular endothelial and smooth muscle cells, ZIP12 expression increased after intracellular zinc chelation by TPEN.

== Association with schizophrenia ==
Associations between ZIP12 and schizophrenia have been reported. A non-coding polymorphism in ZIP12 has been described as being more prevalent in patients with schizophrenia, although this finding has not yet been replicated in other studies. In another study using genome-wide microarrays and post-mortem brain tissue, researchers found higher abundance of ZIP12 mRNA in frontal lobe, superior frontal gyrus, and inferior frontal gyrus of brains from schizophrenic subjects. Higher expression of both splice variants of ZIP12 was detected in the brains of patients with schizophrenia.

== Possible link to autism ==
Mutations and copy number variations in SLC39A12 have been reported for autism, although it is unclear whether genetic variability contributes towards autism risk. In one study assessing copy number variations in Han Chinese subjects with autism, one person had a heterozygous deletion in SLC39A12. In another study, a premature stop codon was detected in one copy of SLC39A12 for one autistic subject.

== Possible associations with cancer ==
Altered expression and mutations in ZIP12 have been detected in various cancers. In 145 patients with esophageal adenocarcinoma, whole exome sequencing found that 12 patients had ZIP12 missense mutations in tumors negative for microsatellite instability. Coding mutations in ZIP12 were also detected in a separate study on esophageal adenocarcinoma. Differences in ZIP12 expression has been reported in different cancers. ZIP12 mRNA was elevated in non-small cell lung cancer biopsied tissues from at least half of tested patients. ZIP12 protein abundance was lower in the breast cancer lines T47D and MDA-MB-231 when compared to non-malignant mammary cell line MCF10A.

== Other associations or functions of ZIP12 ==
Associations of ZIP12 with additional diseases or physiological functions have been reported. In broiler male chicks, ZIP12 mRNA expression in the duodenum, a region of the small intestine, decreases in response to an oral challenge with Salmonella. ZIP12 mRNA and protein increased in lung and liver of chickens after ascites syndrome by intravenous cellulose microparticle injection. The restoration of zinc to zinc-deficient T-cells induces ZIP12 expression, which may promote cytokine production by the immune system. Using quantitative trait loci (QTL) mapping in 2 different cow strains, SLC39A12 (ZIP12) may be a candidate gene that affects fertility in female Chinese and Nordic Holstein cows. ZIP12 mRNA is more abundant in mouse oocytes compared to cumulus cells, which indicates that ZIP12 may play a role in reproduction and fertility. A genome-wide association study (GWAS) in horses has linked an intronic polymorphism in SLC39A12 to endurance racing performance in Arabian horses. One study reported that fasting glucose is associated with two polymorphisms in the SLC39A12 gene, although these findings have not been confirmed in other studies and ZIP12 expression has not been detected in the pancreas.
