= AP503 =

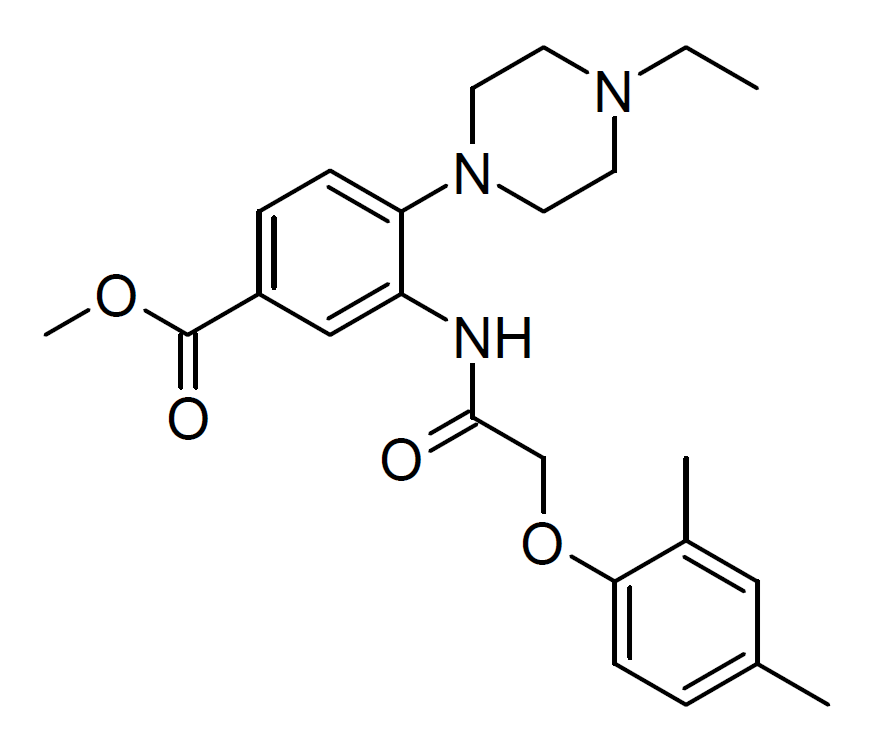

Identifiers
- IUPAC name: methyl 3-[[2-(2,4-dimethylphenoxy)acetyl]amino]-4-(4-ethylpiperazin-1-yl)benzoate
- CAS Number: 767299-99-0
- PubChem CID: 7346086
- ChemSpider: 5673228

Chemical and physical data
- Formula: C_{24}H_{31}N_{3}O_{4}
- Molar mass: 425.529 g·mol^{−1}
- 3D model (JSmol): Interactive image
- SMILES: CCN1CCN(CC1)C2=C(C=C(C=C2)C(=O)OC)NC(=O)COC3=C(C=C(C=C3)C)C
- InChI: InChI=1S/C24H31N3O4/c1-5-26-10-12-27(13-11-26)21-8-7-19(24(29)30-4)15-20(21)25-23(28)16-31-22-9-6-17(2)14-18(22)3/h6-9,14-15H,5,10-13,16H2,1-4H3,(H,25,28); Key:CPGGKKARFZXWMR-UHFFFAOYSA-N

AP503 is a chemical compound which acts as an agonist at the androgen receptor GPR133. It increases muscle growth and bone density in animal models, and may have potential applications in the treatment of osteoporosis and sarcopenia in the elderly.

== See also ==
- GL64
