= GPRC6A =

Protein-coding gene in humans

Identifiers
- Aliases: GPRC6A, GPCR, bA86F4.3, G protein-coupled receptor class C group 6 member A
- External IDs: OMIM: 613572; MGI: 2429498; GeneCards: GPRC6A

Gene location (Human)
Chr.	Chromosome 6 (human)
Band	6q22.1	Start	116,792,085 bp
Band	6q22.1	End	116,829,083 bp

Gene location (Mouse)
Chr.	Chromosome 10 (mouse)
Band	10|10 B3	Start	51,490,919 bp
Band	10|10 B3	End	51,507,557 bp
RNA expression pattern
Bgee	Human / Mouse (ortholog); Top expressed in: testicle; gonad; salivary gland; minor salivary glands; islet of Langerhans; human kidney; right adrenal gland; right adrenal cortex; muscle of thigh; left adrenal gland / Top expressed in: embryo; embryo; left lung lobe; right lung lobe; islet of Langerhans; More reference expression data
BioGPS	n/a
Gene ontology
Molecular function	G protein-coupled receptor activity; signal transducer activity; signaling receptor activity
Cellular component	integral component of membrane; cell surface; plasma membrane; intracellular anatomical structure; membrane; integral component of plasma membrane
Biological process	response to amino acid; calcium-mediated signaling; signal transduction; G protein-coupled receptor signaling pathway
Sources:Amigo / QuickGO
Orthologs
Databases	NCBI: entry; OMA: entry
Species	Human	Mouse
Entrez	222545	210198
Ensembl	ENSG00000173612	ENSMUSG00000019905
UniProt	Q5T6X5	Q8K4Z6
RefSeq (mRNA)	NM_148963; NM_001286354; NM_001286355	NM_153071
RefSeq (protein)	NP_001273283; NP_001273284; NP_683766	NP_694711
Location (UCSC)	Chr 6: 116.79 – 116.83 Mb	Chr 10: 51.49 – 51.51 Mb
PubMed search
- Wikidata
View/Edit Human	View/Edit Mouse

G protein-coupled receptor family C group 6 member A (GPRC6A) is a protein that in humans is encoded by the GPRC6A gene. This protein functions as a receptor of L-α-amino acids, cations (e.g., calcium), and osteocalcin. It has also been found to mediate some of the effects of testosterone, but the direct affinity with the receptor is relative low, so the precise mechanism remains controversial.

== Clinical significance ==
GPRC6A has also been linked to prostate cancer progression, and it has been shown to mediate rapid, non-genomic prostate cancer cell responses to testosterone.

== See also ==
- ZIP9
