= ADGRD1 =

Protein-coding gene in the species Homo sapiens

Identifiers
- Aliases: ADGRD1, PGR25, GPR133, adhesion G protein-coupled receptor D1
- External IDs: OMIM: 613639; MGI: 3041203; GeneCards: ADGRD1

Gene location (Human)
Chr.	Chromosome 12 (human)
Band	12q24.33	Start	130,953,907 bp
Band	12q24.33	End	131,141,469 bp

Gene location (Mouse)
Chr.	Chromosome 5 (mouse)
Band	5|5 G1.3	Start	129,173,814 bp
Band	5|5 G1.3	End	129,281,663 bp
RNA expression pattern
Bgee	Human / Mouse (ortholog); Top expressed in: cardiac muscle tissue of right atrium; right auricle of heart; tibial nerve; decidua; right lung; sural nerve; upper lobe of left lung; myocardium of left ventricle; gastric mucosa; apex of heart / Top expressed in: lumbar spinal ganglion; Ileal epithelium; lactiferous gland; ankle joint; extraocular muscle; white adipose tissue; body of femur; sciatic nerve; ascending aorta; thoracic diaphragm; More reference expression data
BioGPS	n/a
Gene ontology
Molecular function	G protein-coupled receptor activity; transmembrane signaling receptor activity; signal transducer activity
Cellular component	integral component of membrane; plasma membrane; membrane; intracellular anatomical structure; integral component of plasma membrane
Biological process	G protein-coupled receptor signaling pathway; cell surface receptor signaling pathway; signal transduction; adenylate cyclase-activating G protein-coupled receptor signaling pathway
Sources:Amigo / QuickGO
Orthologs
Databases	NCBI: entry; OMA: entry
Species	Human	Mouse
Entrez	283383	243277
Ensembl	ENSG00000111452	ENSMUSG00000044017
UniProt	Q6QNK2	Q80T32
RefSeq (mRNA)	NM_198827; NM_001330497	NM_001081342; NM_177734; NM_001347486
RefSeq (protein)	NP_001317426; NP_942122	NP_001074811; NP_001334415
Location (UCSC)	Chr 12: 130.95 – 131.14 Mb	Chr 5: 129.17 – 129.28 Mb
PubMed search
- Wikidata
View/Edit Human	View/Edit Mouse

Adhesion G protein-coupled receptor D1 is a protein that in humans is encoded by the ADGRD1 gene (previously GPR133).

This gene encodes a member of the adhesion-GPCR family of receptors. Family members are characterized by an extended extracellular region with a variable number of protein domains coupled to a TM7 domain via a domain known as the GPCR-Autoproteolysis INducing (GAIN) domain.

ADGRD1 binds androgens, specifically the androgen 5α-dihydrotestosterone (5α-DHT). ADGRD1 is an adhesion G protein-coupled receptor that functions as a membrane receptor for androgens. When activated by 5α-DHT, ADGRD1 increases intracellular cyclic AMP (cAMP) levels in muscle cells, leading to enhanced muscle strength.

Agonists of ADGRD1 such as GL64 and AP503 have potential applications in the treatment of osteoporosis.
