= Zinc transporter ZIP7 =

Protein found in humans

SLC39A7

Identifiers
- Aliases: SLC39A7, D6S115E, D6S2244E, H2-KE4, HKE4, KE4, RING5, ZIP7, solute carrier family 39 member 7, AGM9
- External IDs: OMIM: 601416; MGI: 95909; GeneCards: SLC39A7

Gene location (Human)
| Chr. | Chromosome 6 (human) |
| Band | 6p21.32 | Start | 33,200,445 bp |
| Band | 6p21.32 | End | 33,204,439 bp |

Gene location (Mouse)
| Chr. | Chromosome 17 (mouse) |
| Band | 17 B1|17 17.98 cM | Start | 34,247,243 bp |
| Band | 17 B1|17 17.98 cM | End | 34,250,656 bp |
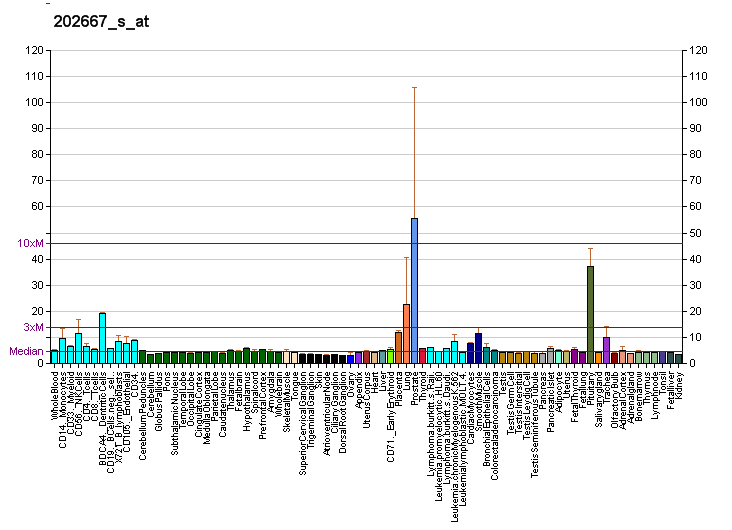
RNA expression pattern
| Bgee | Human / Mouse (ortholog); Top expressed in: stromal cell of endometrium; islet of Langerhans; body of pancreas; placenta; mucosa of transverse colon; pituitary gland; anterior pituitary; rectum; smooth muscle tissue; left adrenal gland / Top expressed in: islet of Langerhans; adrenal gland; placenta; lens; yolk sac; mesencephalon; white adipose tissue; stomach; urinary bladder; lung; More reference expression data |
| BioGPS | More reference expression data |
Gene ontology
| Molecular function | metal ion transmembrane transporter activity; protein binding; zinc ion transmembrane transporter activity |
| Cellular component | integral component of membrane; Golgi apparatus; endoplasmic reticulum membrane; endoplasmic reticulum; membrane; nucleoplasm |
| Biological process | metal ion transport; zinc ion transmembrane transport; zinc ion transport; ion transport; cellular zinc ion homeostasis; transmembrane transport |
Sources:Amigo / QuickGO
Orthologs
| Databases | NCBI: entry; OMA: entry |
| Species | Human | Mouse |
| Entrez | 7922 | 14977 |
| Ensembl | ENSG00000227402; ENSG00000229802; ENSG00000226614; ENSG00000112473; ENSG00000206288 ENSG00000224399 | ENSMUSG00000024327 |
| UniProt | Q92504 | Q31125 |
| RefSeq (mRNA) | NM_006979; NM_001077516; NM_001288777 | NM_001077709; NM_008202 |
| RefSeq (protein) | NP_001070984; NP_001275706; NP_008910; NP_001070984.1; NP_008910.2 | NP_001071177; NP_032228 |
| Location (UCSC) | Chr 6: 33.2 – 33.2 Mb | Chr 17: 34.25 – 34.25 Mb |
| PubMed search |
- Wikidata
| View/Edit Human | View/Edit Mouse |

Zinc transporter ZIP7, also known as solute carrier family 39 member 7, is a transmembrane protein that in humans is encoded by the SLC39A7 gene. It belongs to the ZIP family, which consists of 14 proteins that transport zinc into the cytoplasm. Its primary role is to control the transport of zinc from the ER and Golgi apparatus to the cytoplasm. It also plays a role in glucose metabolism. Its structure consists of helices that bind to zinc in a binuclear metal center. Its fruit fly orthologue is Catsup.

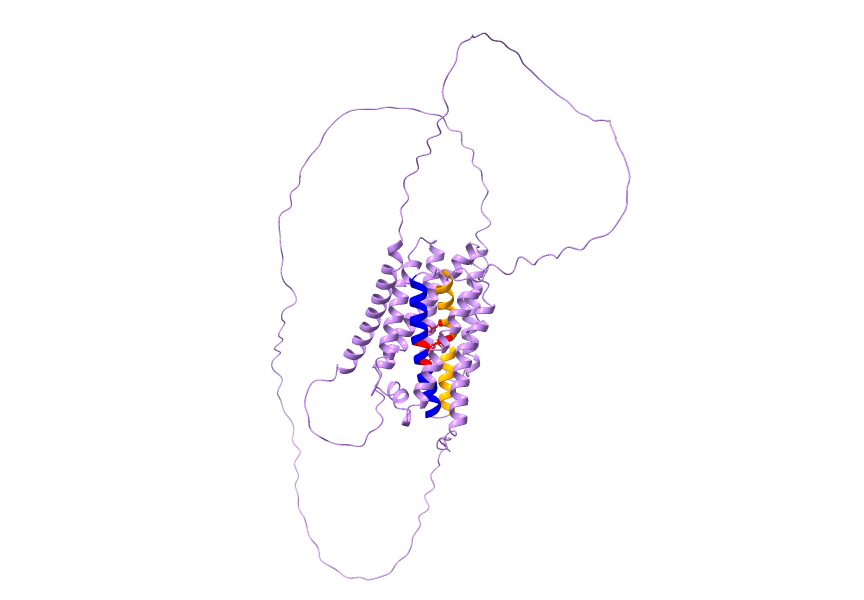
ZIP7 3D Alpha Fold structure modeled in ChimeraX. Accession number: AF-Q92504-F1

== Function ==
Zinc is an essential cofactor for more than 50 classes of enzymes. It is involved in protein, nucleic acid, carbohydrate, and lipid metabolism, as well as in the control of gene transcription, growth, development, and differentiation. Zinc cannot passively diffuse across cell membranes and requires specific transporters, such as SLC39A7, to enter the cytosol from both the extracellular environment and from intracellular storage compartments. The presence of zinc regulates the expression of ZIP transporters.

ZIP7 is a membrane transport protein of the endoplasmic reticulum. Phosphorylation of ZIP7 by casein kinase 2 stimulates the release of zinc ions from the endoplasmic reticulum This provides a signal transduction pathway by which activation of cell surface receptors such as the epidermal growth factor receptor can regulate the activity of downstream phosphatases and kinases. ZIP7 is responsible for maintaining zinc homeostasis in the ER. Due to its key role in several signaling pathways, the loss of ZIP7 results in an accumulation in the endoplasmic reticulum and cause ER stress.

ZIP7 is involved in controlling glucose metabolism in the skeletal muscle cells by affecting the insulin signaling pathway. Reduced expression in glucose metabolism genes and proteins such as Glut4, IRS1, IRS2, and Akt phosphorylation occur when ZIP7 mRNA is downregulated. When zinc released from ZIP7 binds to PTP1B, the insulin signaling pathway is activated.

== Structure ==
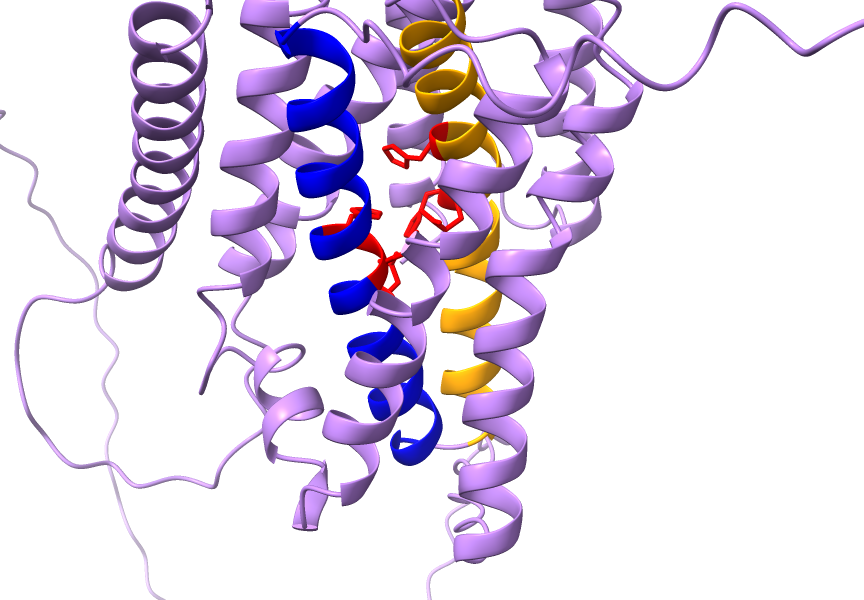
Zoomed in ZIP7 3D Alpha Fold structure modeled in ChimeraX. No zinc atom is present. The dark blue helix is TM4 and the orange helix is TM5. The red residues are amino acids involved in binding to two zinc atoms. Accession number: AF-Q92504-F1

There are no experimentally solved structures of ZIP7 in its entirety. ZIP7 has an predicted AlphaFold structure. ZIP7, like other ZIP proteins, has eight transmembrane (TM) helices with a binuclear metal center. Two zinc ions bind to residues on TM4 (His329, Asn330, and Asp333) and TM5 (His358, Glu395, and His362). ZIP proteins are known to make homo- or heterodimeric complexes. The specific mode of transport zinc takes through ZIP transporters has not yet been determined.

== Role in Cancer ==
ZIP7, a member of the solute carrier family 39 (SLC39) of zinc transporters, emerges as a pivotal factor in cancer progression across multiple malignancies. In breast cancer, ZIP7 expression is markedly elevated in primary tumors, particularly in basal and Her2 subtypes, and correlates with advanced disease stage, metastasis, recurrence, and poorer prognosis. Notably, its hyperactivation is implicated in endocrine resistance, suggesting a crucial role in Endocrine therapy resistance mechanisms.

In colorectal cancer, ZIP7 upregulation is observed in tumor tissues compared to normal counterparts. Inhibition of ZIP7 leads to suppressed cell proliferation, colony formation, and enhanced apoptosis, while its heightened presence correlates with adverse patient outcomes, highlighting its significance as a potential prognostic marker. Similarly, ZIP7 exhibits elevated expression in cervical cancer tissues, where its knockdown results in inhibited proliferation, migration, and invasion of cancer cells. Furthermore, modulation of epithelial-mesenchymal transition markers underscores ZIP7's involvement in metastatic processes, suggesting its potential as a therapeutic target to impede disease progression. In hepatocellular carcinoma, specific inhibition of ZIP7 attenuates PI3K/AKT signaling, leading to suppressed cell growth, colony formation, migration, invasion, and enhanced apoptosis both in vitro and in vivo. This underscores ZIP7's critical role in hepatocellular carcinoma tumorigenesis and its potential as a therapeutic target in this malignancy.

Moreover, microRNAs play a regulatory role in ZIP7 expression across different cancer types. For instance, in prostate cancer, miR-15a-3p targets ZIP7, leading to the suppression of the Wnt/β-catenin signaling pathway and inhibition of proliferation, invasion, and epithelial-mesenchymal transition. Similarly, in gastric cancer, miR-139-5p negatively regulates ZIP7, inhibiting ZIP7-mediated activation of the Akt/mTOR pathway, thereby suppressing cell proliferation and migration while promoting apoptosis.

In a study presented at the 2024 American Association for Cancer Research (AACR) Annual Meeting, researchers introduced rabbit polyclonal antibodies specifically targeting ZIP7 to both human triple-negative breast cancer cells (TNBC) and normal breast epithelial cells (NBE) obtained from the same patient. Utilizing flow cytometry analysis, they observed substantial binding of the ZIP7 antibodies to TNBC cells, while minimal binding was noted in NBE cells from the same individual. Moreover, cytotoxicity assays revealed that the ZIP7-targeted antibodies, in combination with a secondary anti-rabbit Antibody-Drug Conjugate (ADC), selectively induced cell death in TNBC cells over NBE cells. Importantly, this preferential killing effect was attributed to the aberrant surface expression of ZIP7 on TNBC cells, coupled with its involvement in cell proliferation-related signaling pathways specific to TNBC.

In summary, ZIP7 emerges as a critical regulator of cancer progression, influencing key cellular processes such as proliferation, invasion, migration, and apoptosis across various malignancies. Targeting ZIP7 or its regulatory mechanisms holds therapeutic promise in cancer treatment strategies, highlighting its potential as a prognostic marker and therapeutic target in oncology research.

== See also ==
- Solute carrier family
