= TPEN =

Names
- Preferred IUPAC name N^{1},N^{1},N^{2},N^{2}-Tetrakis[(pyridin-2-yl)methyl]ethane-1,2-diamine

Identifiers
CAS Number	16858-02-9
3D model (JSmol)	Interactive image
ChEBI	CHEBI:88217
ChEMBL	ChEMBL1472575
ChemSpider	5318
ECHA InfoCard	100.110.079
EC Number	605-520-7
PubChem CID	5519
UNII	R9PTU1U29I
CompTox Dashboard (EPA)	DTXSID50168583
- InChI: InChI=1S/C26H28N6/c1-5-13-27-23(9-1)19-31(20-24-10-2-6-14-28-24)17-18-32(21-25-11-3-7-15-29-25)22-26-12-4-8-16-30-26/h1-16H,17-22H2 Key: CVRXLMUYFMERMJ-UHFFFAOYSA-N
- SMILES: c1ccc(nc1)CN(CCN(Cc1ccccn1)Cc1ccccn1)Cc1ccccn1

Properties
Chemical formula	C_{26}H_{28}N_{6}
Molar mass	424.552 g·mol^{−1}
Appearance	Crystalline solid
- Except where otherwise noted, data are given for materials in their standard state (at 25 °C [77 °F], 100 kPa). Infobox references

TPEN (N,N,N′,N′-tetrakis(2-pyridinylmethyl)-1,2-ethanediamine) is an intracellular membrane-permeable ion chelator. TPEN has a high affinity for many transition metals and should not be considered specific or selective for a particular ion. Chelators can be used in chelation therapy to remove toxic metals in the body. TPEN is a chelator that has a high affinity for zinc. For example, one study showed that TPEN is a stronger chelator compared to other chelators like pentetic acid (DTPA) when high levels of zinc are present (15 μM). When low levels of zinc were present however (0, 3, 6, 9 and 12 μM zinc), there was no significant difference. TPEN is a hexadentate ligand which also forms complexes with other soft metal ions such as Cd^{2+}.

== Toxicity ==
In addition to a heavy metal chelator, TPEN is also known to be an inducer of apoptosis, thus it may be toxic to cells. One study showed that depletion of zinc by TPEN induced apoptosis in liver cells of rats. This may be because zinc is necessary for normal functioning of the body; for example, zinc acts as a cofactor for enzymes such as insulin-degrading enzyme. Zinc deficiency symptoms include growth and development problems, hair loss, diarrhea, loss of appetite, and more.

One study showed that TPEN induces translocation of cytochrome c from the mitochondria to the cytosol in human peripheral blood T lymphocytes. This leads to the activation of caspases-3, -8, and -9. When these T lymphocytes were pretreated with caspase inhibitors, DNA fragmentation (an indicator of apoptosis) was prevented. This suggests that apoptosis that is triggered by zinc deficiency is dependent on caspase proteins. Similar results were shown in rat and human thymocytes when TPEN was used. TPEN is also shown to induce apoptosis in K562 cells, and high doses (120 μM) of zinc result in microglial cell death. One study examined the requirement for p53, a tumor suppressor protein, as an upstream transcription factor in TPEN-induced neuronal apoptosis, and found that depletion of intracellular zinc with TPEN induces apoptosis. Additionally, the same study found that TPEN increased the expression of pro-apoptotic genes and led to the activation of caspase-11, a mammalian protease. These results suggest that the p53 tumor suppressor protein may play a role in regulating TPEN-induced neuronal apoptosis. Although these studies found that TPEN induces apoptosis, another study found that TPEN inhibits sodium dithionite and glucose deprivation (SDGD)-Induced neuronal death by modulating apoptosis.

== Hypoxia ==
One study showed that after hypoxia, an increase in intracellular zinc induced an increase in reactive oxygen species via activation of NADPH oxidase. Although reactive oxygen species are needed for some functions (such as secondary signaling), they are unstable and are commonly known to cause damage to DNA, lipids, and proteins when at high levels. During the study, the application of TPEN prevented a zinc-induced increase in reactive oxygen species. This may have implications for diseases that have hypoxic conditions, such as stroke. Additionally, another study showed that TPEN induced DNA damage in human colon cancer cells in a reactive oxygen species-dependent manner. One implication may be that TPEN can be used as a form of treatment for hypoxic conditions and possibly be used to target specific cancers.
