= Zinc transporter ZIP6 =

Protein found in humans

SLC39A6

Identifiers
- Aliases: SLC39A6, LIV-1, ZIP6, solute carrier family 39 member 6, LIV1
- External IDs: OMIM: 608731; MGI: 2147279; GeneCards: SLC39A6

Gene location (Human)
| Chr. | Chromosome 18 (human) |
| Band | 18q12.2 | Start | 36,108,531 bp |
| Band | 18q12.2 | End | 36,129,385 bp |

Gene location (Mouse)
| Chr. | Chromosome 18 (mouse) |
| Band | 18|18 A2 | Start | 24,712,938 bp |
| Band | 18|18 A2 | End | 24,736,874 bp |
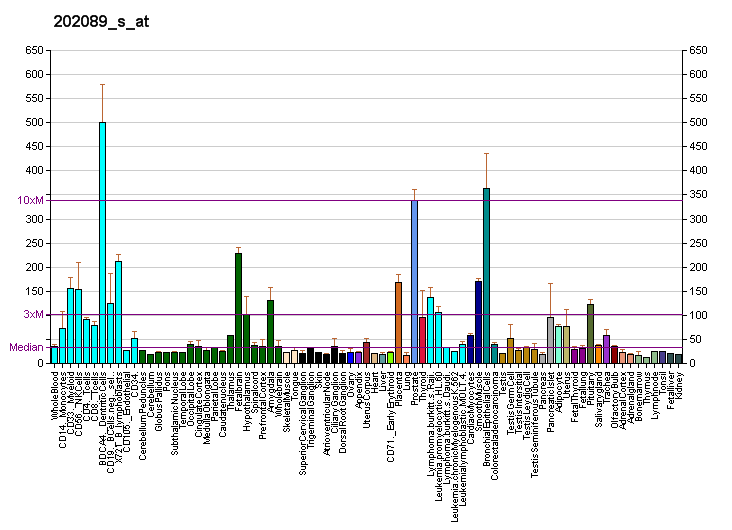

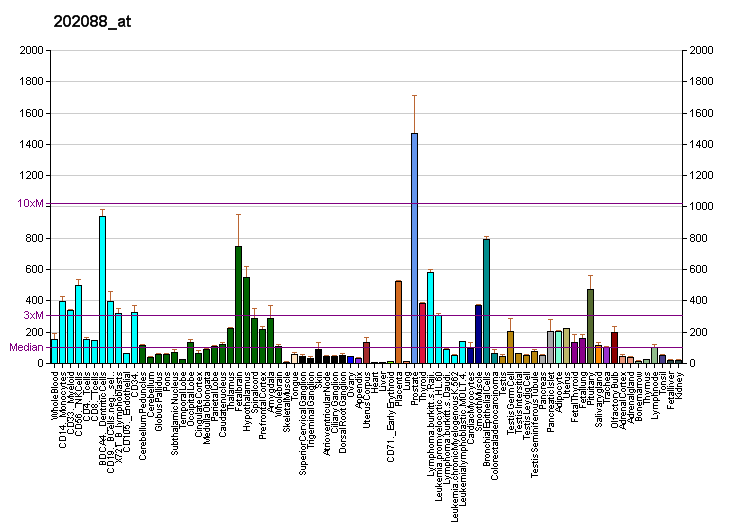
RNA expression pattern
| Bgee | Human / Mouse (ortholog); Top expressed in: secondary oocyte; Epithelium of choroid plexus; retinal pigment epithelium; hair follicle; tibia; seminal vesicula; gingival epithelium; caput epididymis; epithelium of lactiferous gland; lactiferous duct / Top expressed in: hair follicle; superior cervical ganglion; saccule; primary oocyte; supraoptic nucleus; condyle; decidua; molar; otic vesicle; zygote; More reference expression data |
| BioGPS | More reference expression data |
Gene ontology
| Molecular function | metal ion transmembrane transporter activity; zinc ion transmembrane transporter activity |
| Cellular component | integral component of membrane; cell surface; plasma membrane; integral component of plasma membrane; lamellipodium membrane; endoplasmic reticulum; membrane |
| Biological process | metal ion transport; zinc ion transmembrane transport; zinc ion transport; zinc ion import across plasma membrane; ion transport; cellular zinc ion homeostasis; transmembrane transport; transport |
Sources:Amigo / QuickGO
Orthologs
| Databases | NCBI: entry; OMA: entry |
| Species | Human | Mouse |
| Entrez | 25800 | 106957 |
| Ensembl | ENSG00000141424 | ENSMUSG00000024270 |
| UniProt | Q13433 | Q8C145 |
| RefSeq (mRNA) | NM_001099406; NM_012319 | NM_139143 |
| RefSeq (protein) | NP_001092876; NP_036451 | NP_631882 |
| Location (UCSC) | Chr 18: 36.11 – 36.13 Mb | Chr 18: 24.71 – 24.74 Mb |
| PubMed search |
- Wikidata
| View/Edit Human | View/Edit Mouse |

Zinc transporter ZIP6 is a protein that in humans is encoded by the SLC39A6 gene.

Zinc is an essential cofactor for hundreds of enzymes. It is involved in protein, nucleic acid, carbohydrate, and lipid metabolism, as well as in the control of gene transcription, growth, development, and differentiation. SLC39A6 belongs to a subfamily of proteins that show structural characteristics of zinc transporters (Taylor and Nicholson, 2003).[supplied by OMIM]

== See also ==
- Solute carrier family
