= Acrodermatitis enteropathica =

- Other names: Acrodermatitis enteropathica, zinc deficiency type
- Acrodermatitis enteropathica inheritance
- Specialty: Endocrinology
- Symptoms: Dry skin, Emotional lability, Blistering of skin
- Causes: Mutation of the SLC39A4 gene
- Diagnostic method: Skin biopsy, Plasma zinc level
- Treatment: Dietary zinc supplementation

Acrodermatitis enteropathica is an autosomal recessive metabolic disorder affecting the uptake of zinc through the inner lining of the bowel, the mucous membrane. It is characterized by inflammation of the skin (dermatitis) around bodily openings (periorificial) and the tips of fingers and toes (acral), hair loss (alopecia), and diarrhea. It can also be related to deficiency of zinc due to other, i.e. congenital causes.

Other names for acrodermatitis enteropathica include Brandt syndrome and Danbolt–Cross syndrome.

== Signs and symptoms ==
Individuals with acrodermatitis enteropathica may present with the following:

- Blistering of skin
- Dry skin
- Emotional lability
- Glossitis
- Pustule

Alopecia (loss of hair from the scalp, eyebrows, and eyelashes) may occur. Skin lesions may be secondarily infected by bacteria such as Staphylococcus aureus or fungi such as Candida albicans. These skin lesions are accompanied by diarrhea.

== Genetics ==
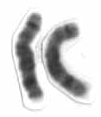
Chr 8

Acrodermatitis enteropathica, in terms of genetics, indicates that a mutation of the SLC39A4 gene on chromosome 8 q24.3 is responsible for the disorder. The SLC39A4 gene encodes a transmembrane protein that serves as a zinc uptake protein. The features of the disease usually start manifesting as an infant is weaned from breast milk. Zinc is very important as it is involved in the function of approximately 100 enzymes in the human body.

== Diagnosis ==
The diagnosis of an individual with acrodermatitis enteropathica includes each of the following:

- Plasma zinc level (lab)
- Light microscopy (skin biopsy)
- Electron microscopy (histology)
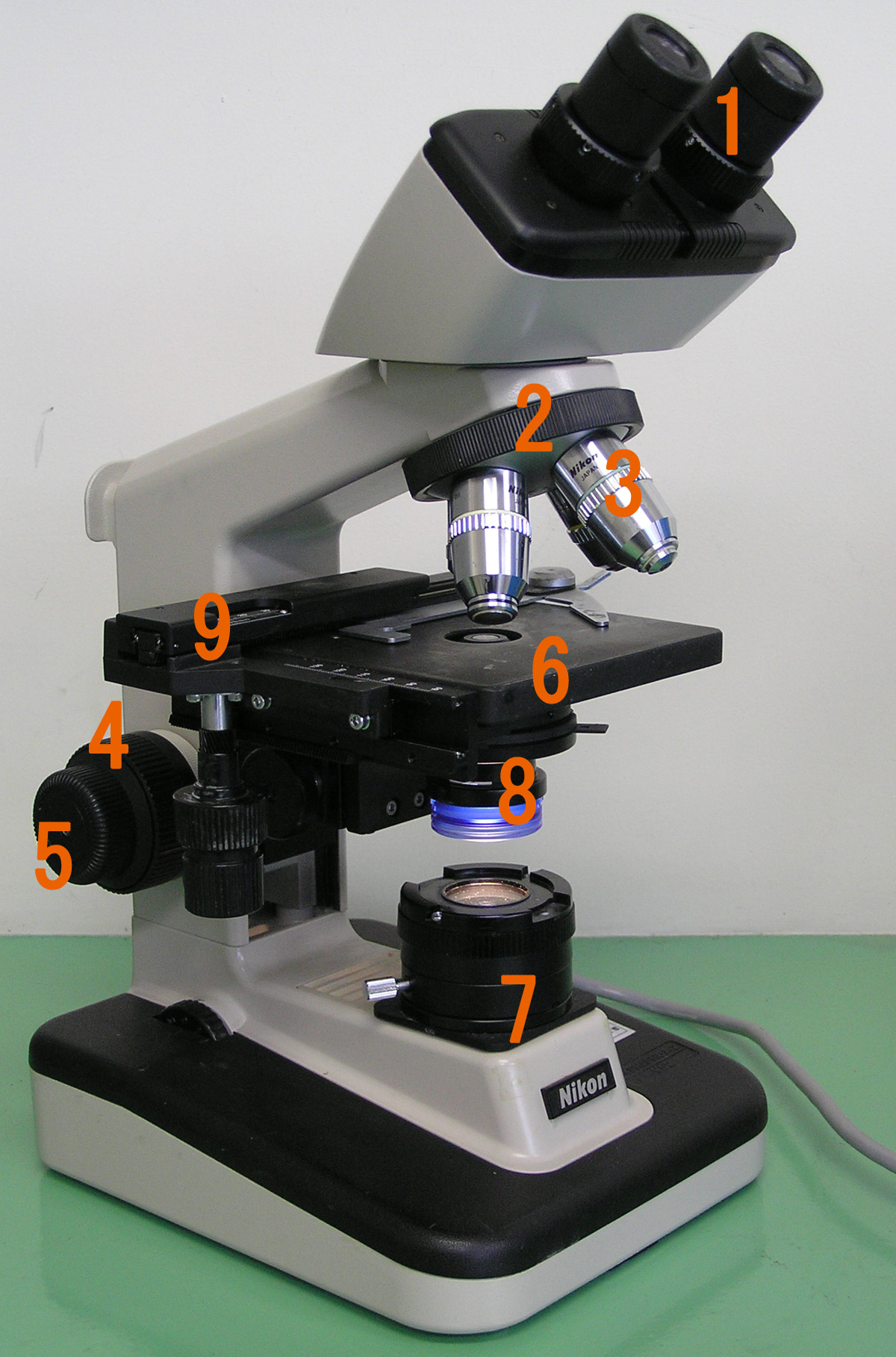
Microscope

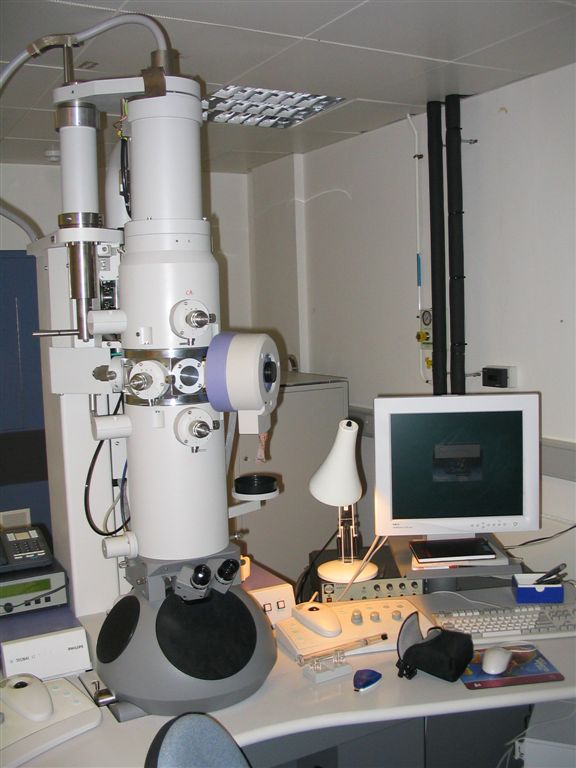
Electron Microscope

== Treatment ==
Acrodermatitis enteropathica without treatment is fatal, and affected individuals may die within a few years. There is no cure for the condition. Treatment includes lifelong dietary zinc supplementation.

== See also ==
- Acrodermatitis
