= Zinc transporter ZIP1 =

Protein found in humans

SLC39A1

Identifiers
- Aliases: SLC39A1, ZIP1, ZIRTL, solute carrier family 39 member 1
- External IDs: OMIM: 604740; MGI: 1353474; GeneCards: SLC39A1

Gene location (Human)
| Chr. | Chromosome 1 (human) |
| Band | 1q21.3 | Start | 153,959,099 bp |
| Band | 1q21.3 | End | 153,968,184 bp |

Gene location (Mouse)
| Chr. | Chromosome 3 (mouse) |
| Band | 3|3 F1 | Start | 90,155,479 bp |
| Band | 3|3 F1 | End | 90,160,919 bp |
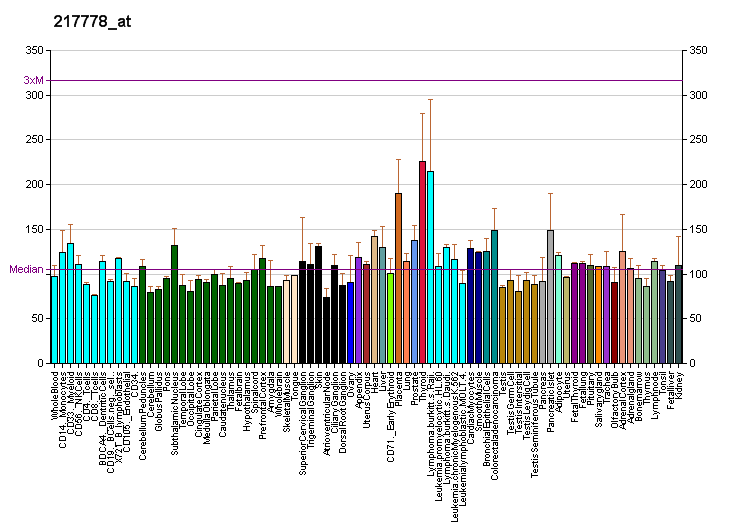
RNA expression pattern
| Bgee | Human / Mouse (ortholog); Top expressed in: placenta; Achilles tendon; upper lobe of left lung; right lung; stromal cell of endometrium; gallbladder; right adrenal gland; left adrenal gland; Descending thoracic aorta; ascending aorta / Top expressed in: prostate; umbilical cord; epidermis; lip; uterus; placenta; urinary bladder; gallbladder; duodenum; stomach; More reference expression data |
| BioGPS | More reference expression data |
Gene ontology
| Molecular function | metal ion transmembrane transporter activity; inorganic cation transmembrane transporter activity; zinc ion transmembrane transporter activity; signaling receptor binding |
| Cellular component | integral component of membrane; plasma membrane; endoplasmic reticulum membrane; membrane; endoplasmic reticulum |
| Biological process | embryonic cranial skeleton morphogenesis; metal ion transport; zinc ion transmembrane transport; cation transport; zinc ion transport; in utero embryonic development; ion transport; limb development; transmembrane transport |
Sources:Amigo / QuickGO
Orthologs
| Databases | NCBI: entry; OMA: entry |
| Species | Human | Mouse |
| Entrez | 27173 | 30791 |
| Ensembl | ENSG00000143570 | ENSMUSG00000052310 |
| UniProt | Q9NY26 | Q9QZ03 |
| RefSeq (mRNA) | NM_014437; NM_001271957; NM_001271958; NM_001271959; NM_001271960 NM_001271961 | NM_013901 |
| RefSeq (protein) | NP_001258886; NP_001258887; NP_001258888; NP_001258889; NP_001258890 NP_055252 | NP_038929 |
| Location (UCSC) | Chr 1: 153.96 – 153.97 Mb | Chr 3: 90.16 – 90.16 Mb |
| PubMed search |
- Wikidata
| View/Edit Human | View/Edit Mouse |

Zinc transporter ZIP1 is a protein that in humans is encoded by the SLC39A1 gene.

The protein ZIP1 is responsible for the active transport of zinc into prostate cells. In many prostate cancers SLC39A1 is silenced causing prostate cancer cells to be low in zinc.

== See also ==
- Solute carrier family
