= Flux (biology) =

Movement of a substance between compartments

In general, flux in biology relates to movement of a substance between compartments. There are several cases where the concept of flux is important.

- The movement of molecules across a membrane: in this case, flux is defined by the rate of diffusion or transport of a substance across a permeable membrane. Except in the case of active transport, net flux is directly proportional to the concentration difference across the membrane, the surface area of the membrane, and the membrane permeability constant.
- In ecology, flux is often considered at the ecosystem level – for instance, accurate determination of carbon fluxes using techniques like eddy covariance (at a regional and global level) is essential for modeling the causes and consequences of global warming.
- Metabolic flux refers to the rate of flow of metabolites through a biochemical network, along a linear metabolic pathway, or through a single enzyme. A calculation may also be made of carbon flux or flux of other elemental components of biomolecules (e.g. nitrogen). The general unit of flux is chemical mass /time (e.g., micromole/minute; mg/kg/minute). Flux rates are dependent on a number of factors, including: enzyme concentration; the concentration of precursor, product, and intermediate metabolites; post-translational modification of enzymes; and the presence of metabolic activators or repressors. Metabolic flux in biologic systems can refer to biosynthesis rates of polymers or other macromolecules, such as proteins, lipids, polynucleotides, or complex carbohydrates, as well as the flow of intermediary metabolites through pathways. Metabolic control analysis and flux balance analysis provide frameworks for understanding metabolic fluxes and their constraints.

== Measuring movement ==
Flux is the net movement of particles across a specified area in a specified period of time. The particles may be ions or molecules, or they may be larger, like insects, muskrats or cars. The units of time can be anything from milliseconds to millennia. Flux is not the same as velocity or speed nor is it the same as density or concentration. Movement itself is not enough.
