= Zinc transporter ZIP2 =

Protein found in humans

SLC39A2

Identifiers
- Aliases: SLC39A2, 6A1, ETI-1, ZIP-2, ZIP2, solute carrier family 39 member 2
- External IDs: OMIM: 612166; MGI: 2684326; GeneCards: SLC39A2

Gene location (Human)
Chr.	Chromosome 14 (human)
Band	14q11.2	Start	20,999,255 bp
Band	14q11.2	End	21,001,871 bp

Gene location (Mouse)
Chr.	Chromosome 14 (mouse)
Band	14|14 C2	Start	52,130,346 bp
Band	14|14 C2	End	52,134,202 bp
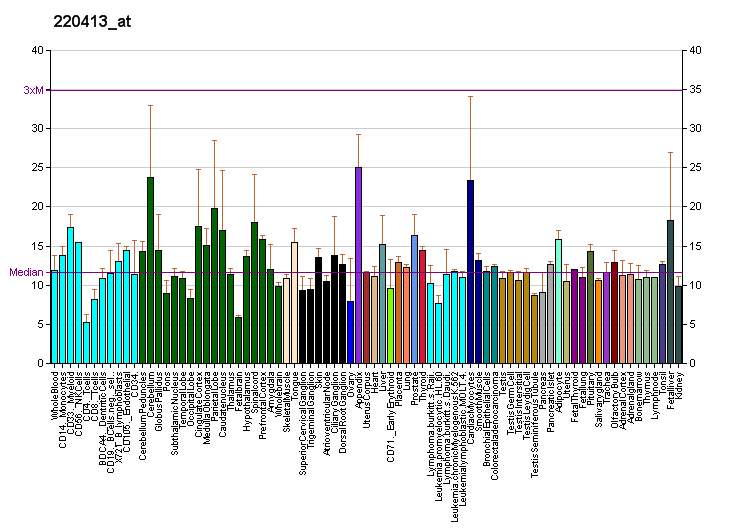
RNA expression pattern
Bgee	Human / Mouse (ortholog); Top expressed in: skin of abdomen; skin of leg; epithelium of esophagus; gingival epithelium; vulva; cervix epithelium; skin of arm; seminal vesicula; vagina; palpebral conjunctiva / Top expressed in: cervix; lip; gastrula; decidua; vestibular membrane of cochlear duct; olfactory epithelium; blastocyst; morula; neural layer of retina; primary visual cortex; More reference expression data
BioGPS	More reference expression data
Gene ontology
Molecular function	metal ion transmembrane transporter activity; zinc ion transmembrane transporter activity
Cellular component	integral component of membrane; plasma membrane; integral component of plasma membrane; membrane; cytoplasmic vesicle
Biological process	metal ion transport; zinc ion transport; ion transport; zinc ion transmembrane transport; transmembrane transport
Sources:Amigo / QuickGO
Orthologs
Databases	NCBI: entry; OMA: entry
Species	Human	Mouse
Entrez	29986	214922
Ensembl	ENSG00000165794	ENSMUSG00000072572
UniProt	Q9NP94	G3X943
RefSeq (mRNA)	NM_014579; NM_001256588	NM_001039676
RefSeq (protein)	NP_001243517; NP_055394	NP_001034765
Location (UCSC)	Chr 14: 21 – 21 Mb	Chr 14: 52.13 – 52.13 Mb
PubMed search
- Wikidata
View/Edit Human	View/Edit Mouse

Zinc transporter ZIP2 is a protein that in humans is encoded by the SLC39A2 gene.

== See also ==
- Solute carrier family
