= Zinc transporter ZIP3 =

Protein found in humans

SLC39A3

Identifiers
- Aliases: SLC39A3, ZIP-3, ZIP3, solute carrier family 39 member 3
- External IDs: OMIM: 612168; MGI: 2147269; GeneCards: SLC39A3

Gene location (Human)
Chr.	Chromosome 19 (human)
Band	19p13.3	Start	2,732,204 bp
Band	19p13.3	End	2,740,028 bp

Gene location (Mouse)
Chr.	Chromosome 10 (mouse)
Band	10|10 C1	Start	80,864,372 bp
Band	10|10 C1	End	80,873,260 bp
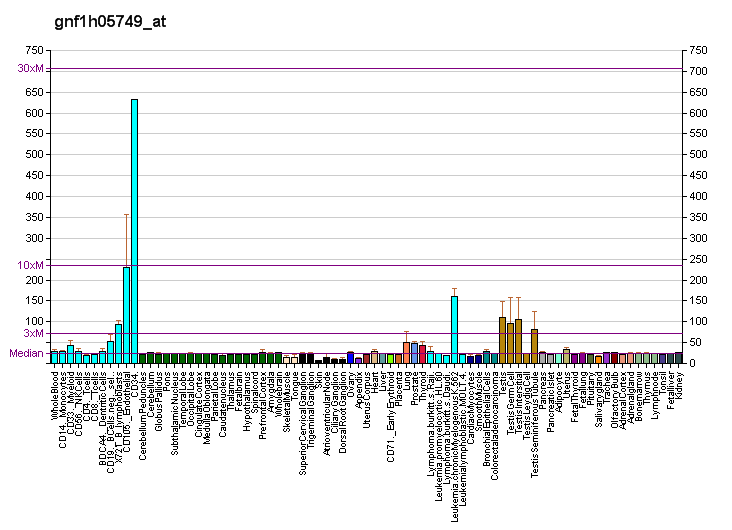
RNA expression pattern
Bgee	Human / Mouse (ortholog); Top expressed in: left testis; right testis; stromal cell of endometrium; prefrontal cortex; apex of heart; islet of Langerhans; smooth muscle tissue; Brodmann area 9; monocyte; cingulate gyrus / Top expressed in: neural layer of retina; spermatocyte; dentate gyrus of hippocampal formation granule cell; superior frontal gyrus; primary visual cortex; subiculum; olfactory tubercle; cerebellar cortex; medial dorsal nucleus; lateral geniculate nucleus; More reference expression data
BioGPS	More reference expression data
Gene ontology
Molecular function	metal ion transmembrane transporter activity; zinc ion transmembrane transporter activity
Cellular component	integral component of membrane; plasma membrane; membrane
Biological process	metal ion transport; zinc ion transport; ion transport; transmembrane transport; cell morphogenesis; in utero embryonic development; T cell homeostasis; embryonic cranial skeleton morphogenesis; limb development; zinc ion transmembrane transport
Sources:Amigo / QuickGO
Orthologs
Databases	NCBI: entry; OMA: entry
Species	Human	Mouse
Entrez	29985	106947
Ensembl	ENSG00000141873	ENSMUSG00000046822
UniProt	Q9BRY0	Q99K24
RefSeq (mRNA)	NM_213568; NM_144564	NM_134135; NM_001358898
RefSeq (protein)	NP_653165; NP_998733	NP_598896; NP_001345827
Location (UCSC)	Chr 19: 2.73 – 2.74 Mb	Chr 10: 80.86 – 80.87 Mb
PubMed search
- Wikidata
View/Edit Human	View/Edit Mouse

Zinc transporter ZIP3 is a protein that in humans is encoded by the SLC39A3 gene.

== See also ==
- Solute carrier family
