= Zinc transporter ZIP4 =

Protein found in humans

SLC39A4

Identifiers
- Aliases: SLC39A4, AEZ, AWMS2, ZIP4, solute carrier family 39 member 4
- External IDs: OMIM: 607059; MGI: 1919277; GeneCards: SLC39A4

Gene location (Human)
Chr.	Chromosome 8 (human)
Band	8q24.3	Start	144,409,742 bp
Band	8q24.3	End	144,416,844 bp

Gene location (Mouse)
Chr.	Chromosome 15 (mouse)
Band	15|15 D3	Start	76,496,583 bp
Band	15|15 D3	End	76,501,584 bp
RNA expression pattern
Bgee	Human / Mouse (ortholog); Top expressed in: duodenum; mucosa of transverse colon; human kidney; renal cortex; body of stomach; left lobe of thyroid gland; fundus; right ovary; right lobe of thyroid gland; skin of abdomen / Top expressed in: jejunum; duodenum; yolk sac; ileum; choroid plexus of fourth ventricle; epithelium of small intestine; intestinal villus; left lobe of liver; right lung lobe; left colon; More reference expression data
BioGPS	n/a
Gene ontology
Molecular function	metal ion transmembrane transporter activity; zinc ion transmembrane transporter activity
Cellular component	integral component of membrane; endosome; recycling endosome membrane; plasma membrane; membrane; integral component of plasma membrane; cytoplasmic vesicle; apical plasma membrane
Biological process	metal ion transport; zinc ion transport; ion transport; zinc ion import across plasma membrane; transmembrane transport; signal transduction; cellular zinc ion homeostasis; cellular response to zinc ion starvation
Sources:Amigo / QuickGO
Orthologs
Databases	NCBI: entry; OMA: entry
Species	Human	Mouse
Entrez	55630	72027
Ensembl	ENSG00000147804; ENSG00000285243	ENSMUSG00000063354
UniProt	Q6P5W5	Q78IQ7
RefSeq (mRNA)	NM_001280557; NM_017767; NM_130849; NM_001374839	NM_028064
RefSeq (protein)	NP_001267486; NP_060237; NP_570901; NP_001361768	NP_082340
Location (UCSC)	Chr 8: 144.41 – 144.42 Mb	Chr 15: 76.5 – 76.5 Mb
PubMed search
- Wikidata
View/Edit Human	View/Edit Mouse

Zinc transporter ZIP4 is a transmembrane protein which in humans is encoded by the SLC39A4 gene. It is associated with acrodermatitis enteropathica.

== See also ==
- Solute carrier family
