= T-cadherin =

GPI-anchored signaling protein

CDH13
Available structures
PDB	Ortholog search: PDBe RCSB
PDB	List of PDB id codes 2V37

Identifiers
- Aliases: CDH13, CDHH, P105, cadherin 13
- External IDs: OMIM: 601364; MGI: 99551; HomoloGene: 20335; GeneCards: CDH13; OMA:CDH13 - orthologs

Gene location (Human)
Chr.	Chromosome 16 (human)
Band	16q23.3	Start	82,626,965 bp
Band	16q23.3	End	83,800,640 bp

Gene location (Mouse)
Chr.	Chromosome 8 (mouse)
Band	8 E1|8 65.97 cM	Start	119,010,472 bp
Band	8 E1|8 65.97 cM	End	120,051,660 bp
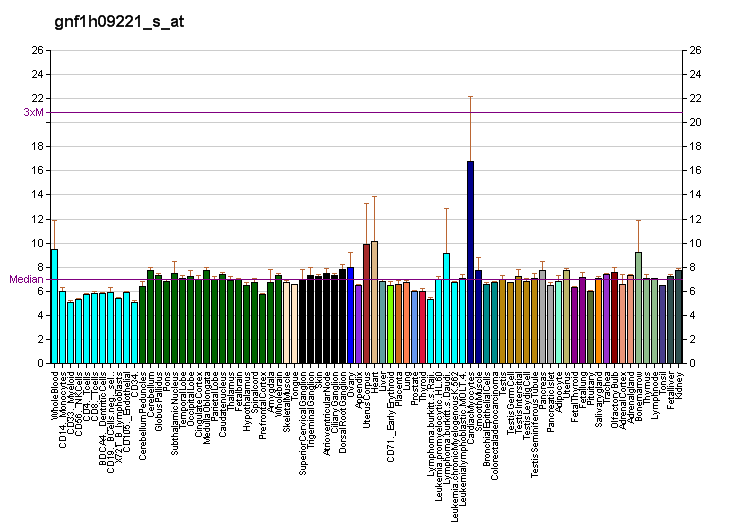

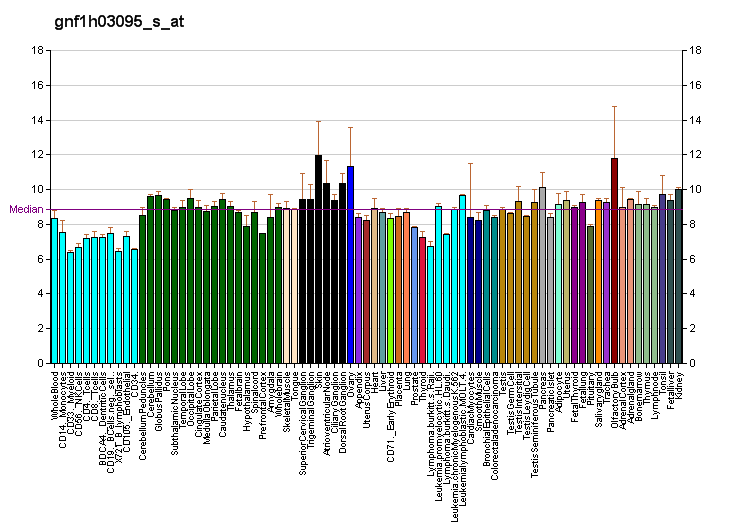
RNA expression pattern
Bgee	Human / Mouse (ortholog); Top expressed in: Descending thoracic aorta; right coronary artery; ascending aorta; stromal cell of endometrium; popliteal artery; tibial arteries; Achilles tendon; quadriceps femoris muscle; vastus lateralis muscle; left coronary artery / Top expressed in: ankle; tunica media of zone of aorta; right ventricle; myocardium of ventricle; muscle of thigh; ventromedial nucleus; interventricular septum; cardiac muscle tissue of left ventricle; ankle joint; suprachiasmatic nucleus; More reference expression data
BioGPS	More reference expression data
Gene ontology
Molecular function	calcium ion binding; protein homodimerization activity; adiponectin binding; cadherin binding; metal ion binding; low-density lipoprotein particle binding; lipoprotein particle binding; cytoskeletal protein binding
Cellular component	cytoplasm; membrane; focal adhesion; plasma membrane; perinuclear region of cytoplasm; caveola; anchored component of membrane; neuron projection; extracellular exosome; external side of plasma membrane; extracellular space; extracellular matrix; extracellular region; cell surface; catenin complex; synapse; collagen-containing extracellular matrix; GABA-ergic synapse
Biological process	calcium-dependent cell-cell adhesion via plasma membrane cell adhesion molecules; regulation of endocytosis; positive regulation of smooth muscle cell proliferation; negative regulation of cell adhesion; positive regulation of calcium-mediated signaling; positive regulation of endothelial cell proliferation; positive regulation of cell-matrix adhesion; positive regulation of cell migration; low-density lipoprotein particle mediated signaling; regulation of epidermal growth factor receptor signaling pathway; sprouting angiogenesis; response to organic substance; positive regulation of positive chemotaxis; keratinocyte proliferation; cell adhesion; Rho protein signal transduction; mitotic cell cycle; Rac protein signal transduction; localization within membrane; adherens junction organization; endothelial cell migration; negative regulation of cell population proliferation; lamellipodium assembly; homophilic cell adhesion via plasma membrane adhesion molecules; positive regulation of transcription by RNA polymerase II; cell morphogenesis; cell-cell junction assembly; cell-cell adhesion mediated by cadherin; cell-cell adhesion
Sources:Amigo / QuickGO
Orthologs
Species	Human	Mouse
Entrez	1012	12554
Ensembl	ENSG00000140945	ENSMUSG00000031841
UniProt	P55290	Q9WTR5
RefSeq (mRNA)	NM_001220488; NM_001220489; NM_001220490; NM_001220491; NM_001220492 NM_001257	NM_019707
RefSeq (protein)	NP_001207417; NP_001207418; NP_001207419; NP_001207420; NP_001207421 NP_001248	NP_062681
Location (UCSC)	Chr 16: 82.63 – 83.8 Mb	Chr 8: 119.01 – 120.05 Mb
PubMed search
- Wikidata
View/Edit Human	View/Edit Mouse

T-cadherin, also known as cadherin 13, H-cadherin (heart), and CDH13, is a unique member of the cadherin protein family. Unlike typical cadherins that span across the cell membrane with distinct transmembrane and cytoplasmic domains, T-cadherin lacks these features and is instead anchored to the cell's plasma membrane through a GPI anchor.

Classical cadherins are central to cell–cell adhesion, critical for shaping tissues during embryonic development and maintaining tissue integrity in adults. They act as receptors that mediate cellular responses by transmitting signals from the extracellular environment to the intracellular machinery, thereby activating key pathways like the beta-catenin/Wnt pathway and influencing cytoskeletal reorganization. In contrast, T-cadherin is not involved in forming cell-cell junctions but participates in signaling pathways that modulate cellular responses to low-density lipoprotein (LDL) particles, affecting calcium signaling, cell migration, and phenotypic alterations. The identification of specific signaling partners and understanding the pathways influenced by T-cadherin are active areas of research, highlighting its potential role in vascular biology and disease pathologies.

== Mediation of intracellular signaling in vascular cells ==
Though T-cadherin can mediate weak adhesion in aggregation assays in vitro, the lack of intracellular domain suggests that T-cadherin is not involved in stable cell-cell adhesion. In vivo T-cadherin was detected on the apical cell surface of the chick intestinal epithelium. In cultures of transfected MDCS cells, T-cadherin was also expressed apically, whereas N-cadherin located basolaterally corresponded to the zone of cell contacts.

The apical cell surface distribution of T-cadherin was proposed to possibly endow T-cadherin with recognition functions. In confluent cultures of vascular cells, T-cadherin was distributed equally over the entire cell surface, in contrast to VE-cadherin, which was restricted to the cell junctions. In migrating vascular cells, T-cadherin was located at the leading edge as revealed by confocal microscopy. The distribution of T-cadherin on the cell membrane is restricted to lipid rafts where it co-localizes with signal-transducing molecules. These data strongly implicates T-cadherin in intracellular signaling rather than adhesion.

Studying signaling effects of low density lipoproteins (LDL) in vascular smooth muscles (VSMCs), T-cadherin was isolated and identified as new LDL receptor using human aortic media and the ligand-blotting method. The properties of T-cadherin as an LDL receptor were markedly different from the presently known types of LDL receptors. LDL binding to T-cadherin leads to the activation of Erk 1/2 tyrosine kinase and the nuclear translocation of NF-kappaB.

T-cadherin overexpression in ECs facilitates spontaneous cell migration, formation of stress fibers and change of the phenotype from quiescent to promigratory. T-cadherin expression results in LDL-induced migration of T-cadherin expressing cells compared to control. It is likely that T-cadherin regulates cell migration and phenotype via activation of small G-proteins with subsequent actin reorganization. RhoA/ROCK activation is necessary for cell contraction, stress fiber assembly and inhibition of spreading, while Rac is required for the formation of membrane protrusions and actin-rich lamellipodia at the leading edge of migrating cells.

== Functions in the vasculature ==
The function of T-cadherin in situ, in normal conditions, and in pathology is still largely unknown. T-cadherin is highly expressed in the heart, aortic wall, neurons of the brain cortex and spinal cord and also in the small blood vessels in spleen and other organs.

Expression of T-cadherin is upregulated in atherosclerotic lesions and post-angioplasty restenosis —conditions associated with pathological angiogenesis. T-cadherin expression is upregulated in ECs, pericytes and VSMC of atherosclerotic lesions.

T-cadherin expression in arterial wall after balloon angioplasty correlates with late stages of neointima formation and coincidentally with the peak in proliferation and differentiation of vascular cells. It is highly expressed in adventitial vasa vasorum of injured arteries suggesting the involvement of T-cadherin in the processes of angiogenesis after vessel injury. These data implicate T-cadherin to be involved in regulation of vascular functioning and remodeling; however, the exact role of T-cadherin in neointima formation and atherosclerosis development is poorly understood.

LDL is not the only ligand for T-cadherin. High-molecular weight (HMW) complexes of adiponectin were suggested to be a specific ligand for T-cadherin. Adiponectin (adipocyte complement-related protein of 30 kDa) is a cytokine produced by adipose tissue and its deficiency is associated with metabolic syndrome, obesity, type II diabetes and atherosclerosis. Adiponectin binding to T-cadherin on vascular cells is associated with NF-kappa B activation. Two membrane adiponectin receptors with distant homology to seven-transmembrane spanning G-protein-coupled receptors, namely AdipoR1 and AdipoR2 were identified in several tissues, but the University of Tokyo announced it was launching an investigation into anonymously made claims of fabricated and falsified data on the identification of AdipoR1 and AdipoR2 in 2016.

== Regulation of cell growth ==
In vitro T-cadherin is implicated in regulation of cell growth, survival and proliferation. In cultured VSMC and primary astrocytes, the expression of T-cadherin depends on proliferation status with maximum at confluency suggesting its regulation of cell growth by contact inhibition. Known mitogens such as platelet-derived growth factor (PDGF)-BB, epidermal growth factor (EGF) or insulin-like growth factor (IGF) elicit a reversible dose- and time-dependent decrease in T-cadherin expression in cultured VSMCs.

Expression of T-cadherin leads to complete inhibition of subcutaneous tumor growth in nude mice. Seeding T-cadherin expressing cells on plastic coated with recombinant aminoterminal fragments of T-cadherin resulted in suppression of cell growth and was found to be associated with increased expression of p21. In T-cadherin deficient C6 glioma cell lines, its overexpression results in growth suppression involving p21Cip1/WAF1 production and G2 arrest.

T-cadherin loss in tumor cells is associated with tumor malignancy, invasiveness and metastasis. Thus, tumor progression in basal cell carcinoma, cutaneous squamous carcinoma, non-small cell lung carcinoma (NSCLC), ovarian cancer, pancreatic cancer, colorectal cancer correlates with downregulation of T-cadherin expression. In psoriasis vulgaris the hyperproliferation of keratinocytes also correlates with the downregulation of T-cadherin expression. The mechanism for T-cadherin suppression is associated with allelic loss or hypermethylation of the T-cadherin gene promoter region.

Transfection of T-cadherin negative neuroblastoma TGW and NH-12 cells with T-cadherin results in their loss of mitogenic proliferative response to epidermal growth factor (EGF) growth stimulation. Re-expression of T-cadherin in human breast cancer cells (MDAMB435) in culture, which originally do not express T-cadherin, results in the change of the phenotype from invasive to normal epithelial-like morphology. Thus, it was hypothesized that T-cadherin functions as a tumor-suppressor factor; inactivation of T-cadherin is associated with tumor malignancy, invasiveness and metastasis.

However, in other tumors T-cadherin expression could promote tumor growth and metastasis. In primary lung tumors the loss of T-cadherin was not attributed to the presence of metastasis in lymph nodes, and in osteosarcomas T-cadherin expression was correlated with metastasis. Furthermore, T-cadherin overexpression was found to be a common feature of human high grade astrocytomas and associated with malignant transformation of astrocytes. Heterozygosity for NF1 (neurofibromatosis 1) tumor suppressor resulting in reduced attachment and spreading and increased motility also coincides with upregulated T-cadherin expression.

Data show that HUVEC cells overexpressing T-cadherin after adenovirus infection enter S-phase more rapidly and exhibit increased proliferation potential. T-cadherin expression increases in HUVEC under conditions of oxidative stress, and production of reactive oxygen species (ROS) contributes to T-cadherin elevated expression. T-cadherin overexpression in HUVEC leads to higher phosphorylation of Phosphatidylinositol 3-kinase (PIK3) – target of Akt, and mTOR – target p70S6K (survival pathway regulator), resulting in reduced levels of caspase activation and increased survival after exposure to oxidative stress. It was suggested that in vascular cells T-cadherin performs a protective role against stress-induced apoptosis.

Tumor cells can regulate gene expression in growing vessels and the surrounding stroma during tumor neovascularization. T-cadherin expression was found to be altered in tumor vessels: in Lewis carcinoma lung metastasis the expression of T-cadherin was upregulated in blood vessels penetrating the tumor, while T-cadherin was not detected in the surrounding tumor tissue. In tumor neovascularization of hepatocellular carcinoma (HCC) T-cadherin is upregulated in intratumoral capillary endothelial cells, whereas in surrounding tumor tissue as well as in normal liver no T-cadherin could be detected. The increase in T-cadherin expression in endothelial cell in HCC was shown to correlate with tumors progression. Presumably, T-cadherin could play a navigating role in the growing tumor vessels, which in the absence of contact inhibition from the stromal cells, grow into the surrounding tumor tissue.

== Guiding molecules in vascular and nervous systems ==
T-cadherin was originally cloned from chick embryo brain, where it was implicated as a negative guiding cue for motor axon projecting through the somitic sclerotome and presumably for migrating neural crest cells . As a substrate or in soluble form, T-cadherin inhibits neurite outgrowth by motor neurons in vitro supporting the assumption that T-cadherin acts as a negative guiding molecule in the developing nervous system.

Considering that the maximal expression of T-cadherin has been observed in nervous and cardiovascular systems, it is likely that T-cadherin is involved in guiding the growing vessel as well. The mechanism of T-cadherin mediated negative guidance in nervous system involves homophilic interaction and contact inhibition; in vascular system it is supposed that T-cadherin expressing blood vessels would avoid T-cadherin expressing tissues.
