= AdipoRon =

Chemical compound

Clinical data
- Routes of administration: Oral
- ATC code: None

Identifiers
- IUPAC name: 2-(4-Benzoylphenoxy)-N-(1-benzylpiperidin-4-yl)acetamide
- CAS Number: 924416-43-3
- PubChem CID: 16307093
- ChemSpider: 11029953
- UNII: ND7UVH6GKJ

Chemical and physical data
- Formula: C_{27}H_{28}N_{2}O_{3}
- Molar mass: 428.532 g·mol^{−1}
- 3D model (JSmol): Interactive image
- SMILES: C1CN(CCC1NC(=O)COC2=CC=C(C=C2)C(=O)C3=CC=CC=C3)CC4=CC=CC=C4

AdipoRon is a selective, orally active, synthetic small-molecule agonist of the adiponectin receptor 1 (AdipoR1) and adiponectin receptor 2 (AdipoR2) (K_{d} = 1.8 μM and 3.1 μM, respectively). It activates AMPK and PPARα signaling and ameliorates insulin resistance, dyslipidemia, and glucose intolerance in db/db mice (an animal model for type II diabetes and obesity). Moreover, AdipoRon has been found to extend the lifespans of db/db mice fed a high-fat diet, as well as improve exercise endurance. The compound was discovered by Japanese researchers in 2013 via screening of a compound library, and is the first orally active, small-molecule agonist of the adiponectin receptors to be identified.

Adiponectin receptor agonists such as AdipoRon have attracted interest as potential therapies for obesity, diabetes, cardiovascular disease, non-alcoholic fatty liver disease, and a panoply of other conditions. In addition, adiponectin has recently been elucidated to mediate the antidepressant, anxiolytic, and neurogenic effects of physical exercise. Dysregulation of adiponectin expression has also been implicated in the pathology of mood disorders, anxiety disorders, eating disorders, neurodegenerative disorders, and various other neuropsychiatric disorders. Also, it has been determined that exercise improves insulin resistance via activation of AdipoR1. As such, adiponectin receptor agonists are a highly interesting therapeutic target for a variety of different conditions. Moreover, it has been suggested they could potentially be used as a substitute for exercise to achieve similar physical and mental health benefits. In 2016, the University of Tokyo announced that it would launch an investigation into claims of fabrication of AdipoR1, AdipoR2, and AdipoRon identification data, as accused by an anonymous person/group called Ordinary_researchers.
