= Adiponectin =

Mammalian protein found in humans

ADIPOQ
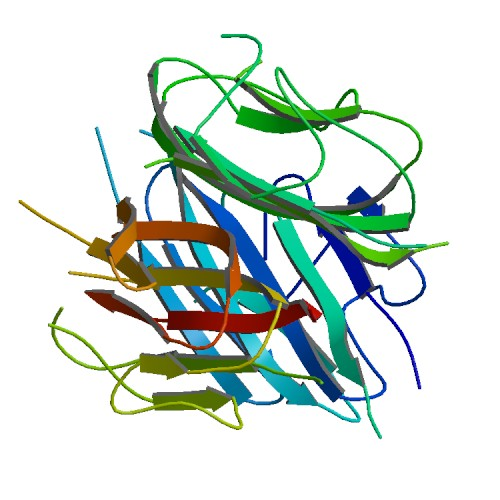

Identifiers
- Aliases: ADIPOQ, ACDC, ACRP30, ADIPQTL1, ADPN, APM-1, APM1, GBP28, adiponectin, C1Q and collagen domain containing, Adiponectin
- External IDs: OMIM: 605441; MGI: 106675; GeneCards: ADIPOQ
Available structures
PDB	Ortholog search: PDBe RCSB
PDB	List of PDB id codes 4DOU

Gene location (Human)
Chr.	Chromosome 3 (human)
Band	3q27.3	Start	186,842,704 bp
Band	3q27.3	End	186,858,463 bp

Gene location (Mouse)
Chr.	Chromosome 16 (mouse)
Band	16 B1|16 13.96 cM	Start	22,965,286 bp
Band	16 B1|16 13.96 cM	End	22,976,778 bp
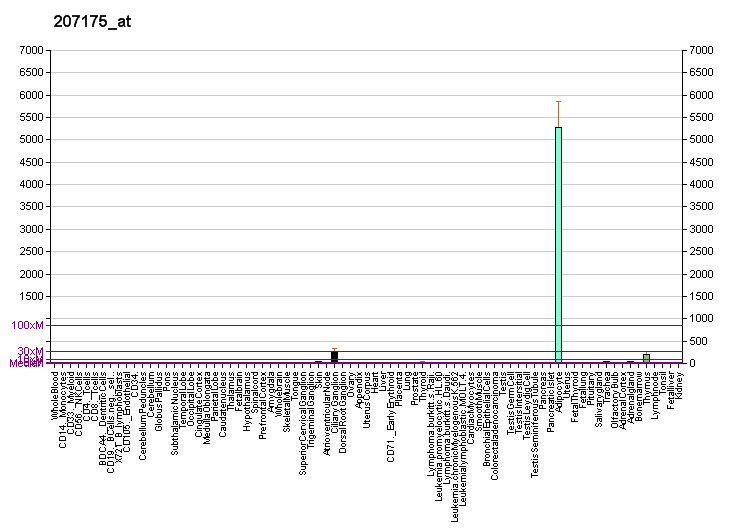
RNA expression pattern
Bgee	Human / Mouse (ortholog); Top expressed in: synovial joint; pericardium; skin of hip; adipose tissue; subcutaneous adipose tissue; abdominal fat; parotid gland; lactiferous duct; Skeletal muscle tissue of rectus abdominis; vena cava / Top expressed in: white adipose tissue; lactiferous gland; tunica adventitia of aorta; brown adipose tissue; subcutaneous adipose tissue; intercostal muscle; ankle joint; parotid gland; ankle; tunica media of zone of aorta; More reference expression data
BioGPS	More reference expression data
Gene ontology
Molecular function	hormone activity; signaling receptor binding; cytokine activity; sialic acid binding; protein homodimerization activity; protein binding; identical protein binding; extracellular matrix structural constituent
Cellular component	cell surface; endoplasmic reticulum; collagen; extracellular space; extracellular region; protein-containing complex; collagen-containing extracellular matrix
Biological process	positive regulation of glucose import; positive regulation of protein phosphorylation; negative regulation of receptor binding; low-density lipoprotein particle clearance; negative regulation of blood pressure; negative regulation of macrophage differentiation; negative regulation of synaptic transmission; generation of precursor metabolites and energy; cellular response to epinephrine stimulus; negative regulation of gluconeogenesis; regulation of glucose metabolic process; circadian rhythm; fatty acid oxidation; positive regulation of interleukin-8 production; glucose metabolic process; protein heterotrimerization; negative regulation of heterotypic cell-cell adhesion; response to ethanol; negative regulation of inflammatory response; cellular response to cAMP; positive regulation of protein kinase A signaling; negative regulation of platelet-derived growth factor receptor signaling pathway; positive regulation of signal transduction; positive regulation of protein metabolic process; negative regulation of fat cell differentiation; response to linoleic acid; detection of oxidative stress; glucose homeostasis; adiponectin-activated signaling pathway; response to tumor necrosis factor; positive regulation of blood pressure; response to nutrient levels; positive regulation of cholesterol efflux; negative regulation of MAP kinase activity; cellular response to insulin stimulus; positive regulation of peptidyl-tyrosine phosphorylation; fatty acid beta-oxidation; negative regulation of tumor necrosis factor production; protein localization to plasma membrane; negative regulation of hormone secretion; protein homooligomerization; response to sucrose; positive regulation of metanephric glomerular visceral epithelial cell development; positive regulation of renal albumin absorption; negative regulation of granulocyte differentiation; response to nutrient; negative regulation of protein autophosphorylation; negative regulation of intracellular protein transport; membrane depolarization; response to glucose; positive regulation of myeloid cell apoptotic process; negative regulation of I-kappaB kinase/NF-kappaB signaling; negative regulation of metanephric mesenchymal cell migration; negative regulation of cell migration; positive regulation of fatty acid metabolic process; brown fat cell differentiation; positive regulation of cAMP-dependent protein kinase activity; positive regulation of glycogen (starch) synthase activity; negative regulation of transcription, DNA-templated; negative regulation of DNA biosynthetic process; positive regulation of protein kinase activity; response to hypoxia; negative regulation of phagocytosis; membrane hyperpolarization; negative regulation of tumor necrosis factor-mediated signaling pathway; positive regulation of monocyte chemotactic protein-1 production; response to glucocorticoid; response to activity; negative regulation of platelet-derived growth factor receptor-alpha signaling pathway; positive regulation of I-kappaB kinase/NF-kappaB signaling; negative regulation of ERK1 and ERK2 cascade; negative regulation of macrophage derived foam cell differentiation; regulation of fatty acid biosynthetic process; regulation of signaling receptor activity; negative regulation of vascular associated smooth muscle cell proliferation; negative regulation of vascular associated smooth muscle cell migration; response to bacterium; positive regulation of cold-induced thermogenesis; negative regulation of cold-induced thermogenesis; signal transduction
Sources:Amigo / QuickGO
Orthologs
Databases	NCBI: entry; OMA: entry
Species	Human	Mouse
Entrez	9370	11450
Ensembl	ENSG00000181092	ENSMUSG00000022878
UniProt	Q15848	Q60994
RefSeq (mRNA)	NM_001177800; NM_004797	NM_009605
RefSeq (protein)	NP_001171271; NP_004788	NP_033735
Location (UCSC)	Chr 3: 186.84 – 186.86 Mb	Chr 16: 22.97 – 22.98 Mb
PubMed search
- Wikidata
View/Edit Human	View/Edit Mouse

Adiponectin (also referred to as GBP-28, apM1, AdipoQ and Acrp30) is a protein hormone and adipokine, which is involved in regulating glucose levels and fatty acid breakdown. In humans, it is encoded by the ADIPOQ gene and is produced primarily in adipose tissue, but also in muscle and even in the brain.

== Structure ==
Adiponectin is a 244-amino-acid-long polypeptide (protein). It has four distinct regions: The first is a short signal sequence that targets the hormone for secretion outside the cell; next is a short region that varies between species; the third is a 65-amino acid region with similarity to collagenous proteins; the last is a globular domain. Overall, this protein shows similarity to the complement 1Q factors (C1Q), but when the three-dimensional structure of the globular region was determined, a striking similarity to TNFα was observed, despite unrelated protein sequences.

== Function ==
Adiponectin is a protein hormone that modulates a number of metabolic processes, including glucose regulation and fatty acid oxidation. Adiponectin is secreted from adipose tissue (and also from the placenta in pregnancy) into the bloodstream and is very abundant in plasma relative to many hormones. High adiponectin levels correlate with a lower risk of diabetes mellitus type 2. Plasma levels of adiponectin are lower in obese subjects than in lean subjects. Many studies have found adiponectin to be inversely correlated with body mass index in patient populations. However, a meta analysis was not able to confirm this association in healthy adults. Circulating adiponectin concentrations increase during caloric restriction in animals and humans, such as in patients with anorexia nervosa. Furthermore, a 2014 study suggests that adipose tissue within bone marrow, which increases during caloric restriction, contributes to elevated circulating adiponectin in this context.

Transgenic mice with increased adiponectin show reduced adipocyte differentiation and increased energy expenditure associated with mitochondrial uncoupling. The hormone plays a role in the suppression of the metabolic derangements that may result in type 2 diabetes, obesity, atherosclerosis, non-alcoholic fatty liver disease (NAFLD) and an independent risk factor for metabolic syndrome. Adiponectin in combination with leptin has been shown to completely reverse insulin resistance in mice. Adiponectin enhances insulin sensitivity primarily though regulation of fatty acid oxidation and suppression of hepatic glucose production.

Adiponectin is secreted into the bloodstream, where it accounts for about 0.01% of all plasma protein at around 5-10 μg/mL. In adults, plasma concentrations are higher in females than males, and are reduced in diabetics compared to nondiabetics. Weight reduction significantly increases circulating concentrations.

Adiponectin automatically self-associates into larger structures. Initially, three adiponectin molecules bind together to form a homotrimer. The trimers continue to self-associate and form hexamers or dodecamers. Like the plasma concentration, the relative levels of the higher-order structures are sexually dimorphic, where females have increased proportions of the high-molecular-weight forms. Recent studies showed that the high-molecular-weight form may be the most biologically active form regarding glucose homeostasis. High-molecular-weight adiponectin was further found to be associated with a lower risk of diabetes with similar magnitude of association as total adiponectin. However, coronary artery disease has been found to be positively associated with high molecular weight adiponectin, but not with low molecular weight adiponectin.

Adiponectin exerts some of its weight-reduction effects via the brain. This is similar to the action of leptin; adiponectin and leptin can act synergistically.

Adiponectin promoted synaptic and memory function in the brain. Humans with lower levels of adiponectin have reduced cognitive function.

== Receptors ==
Adiponectin binds to a number of receptors. So far, two receptors have been identified with homology to G protein-coupled receptors, and one receptor similar to the cadherin family:

- Adiponectin receptor 1 (AdipoR1)
- Adiponectin receptor 2 (AdipoR2)
- T-cadherin - CDH13

These have distinct tissue specificities within the body and have different affinities to the various forms of adiponectin. AdipoR1 is enriched in skeletal muscle, whereas AdipoR2 is enriched in liver. Six months of exercise has been shown in rats to double muscle AdipoR1.

The receptors affect the downstream target AMP kinase, an important cellular metabolic rate control point. Expression of the receptors is correlated with insulin levels, as well as reduced in mouse models of diabetes, particularly in skeletal muscle and adipose tissue.

In 2016, the University of Tokyo announced that it would launch an investigation into claims of fabrication of AdipoR1 and AdipoR2 identification data, as accused by an anonymous person/group called Ordinary_researchers.

== Discovery ==
Adiponectin was first characterised in 1995 in differentiating 3T3-L1 adipocytes (Scherer PE et al.). In 1996 it was characterised in mice as the mRNA transcript most highly expressed in adipocytes. In 2007, adiponectin was identified as a transcript highly expressed in preadipocytes (precursors of fat cells) differentiating into adipocytes.

The human homologue was identified as the most abundant transcript in adipose tissue. Contrary to expectations, despite being produced in adipose tissue, adiponectin was found to be decreased in obesity. This downregulation has not been fully explained. The gene was localised to chromosome 3q27, a region highlighted as affecting genetic susceptibility to type 2 diabetes and obesity. Supplementation by differing forms of adiponectin was able to improve insulin control, blood glucose and triglyceride levels in mouse models.

The gene was investigated for variants that predispose to type 2 diabetes. Several single nucleotide polymorphisms in the coding region and surrounding sequence were identified from several different populations, with varying prevalences, degrees of association and strength of effect on type 2 diabetes. Berberine, an isoquinoline alkaloid, has been shown to increase adiponectin expression, which partly explains its beneficial effects on metabolic disturbances. Mice fed the omega-3 fatty acids eicosapentaenoic acid (EPA) and docosahexaenoic acid (DHA) have shown increased plasma adiponectin. Curcumin, capsaicin, gingerol, and catechins have also been found to increase adiponectin expression.

Phylogenetic distribution includes expression in birds and fish.

== Metabolic influence ==
Adiponectin effects:

- glucose flux
  - decreased gluconeogenesis
  - increased glucose uptake
- lipid catabolism
  - β-oxidation
  - triglyceride clearance
- protection from endothelial dysfunction (important facet of atherosclerotic formation)
- insulin sensitivity
- weight loss
- control of energy metabolism.
- upregulation of uncoupling proteins
- reduction of TNF-alpha
- promotion of reverse cholesterol transport

Regulation of adiponectin

- Obesity is associated with decreased adiponectin.
  - The exact mechanism of regulation is unknown, but adiponectin could be regulated by post-translational mechanisms in cells.

== Hypoadiponectinemia ==
A low level of adiponectin is an independent risk factor for developing:

- Metabolic syndrome
- Diabetes mellitus
- Dyslipidemia
- Obesity
- Hypertension

== Other ==
Lower levels of adiponectin are associated with ADHD in adults.

Adiponectin levels were found to be increased in rheumatoid arthritis patients responding to DMARDs or TNF inhibitor therapy.

A low adiponectin to leptin ratio has been found in patients with COVID-19 pneumonia compared to healthy controls.

Exercise induced release of adiponectin increased hippocampal growth and led to antidepressive symptoms in mice.

Several studies have found a positive correlation in caffeine consumption and increased adiponectin levels, although the mechanism for this is unknown and requires more research.

=== As a medication target ===
Circulating levels of adiponectin can indirectly be increased through lifestyle modifications and certain medications such as statins.

A small molecule adiponectin receptor AdipoR1 and AdipoR2 agonist, AdipoRon, has been reported. In 2016, the University of Tokyo announced it was launching an investigation into anonymously made claims of fabricated and falsified data on AdipoR1, AdipoR2, and AdipoRon.

Extracts of sweet potatoes have been reported to increase levels of adiponectin and thereby improve glycemic control in humans. However, a systematic review concluded there is insufficient evidence to support the consumption of sweet potatoes to treat type 2 diabetes mellitus.

Adiponectin is apparently able to cross the blood-brain-barrier. However, conflicting data on this issue exist. Adiponectin has a half-life of 2.5 hours in humans.
