= TASC =

TASC may refer to:

- Take a Swing at Cancer, a non-profit charity, United States
- TASC FC, a football club in Botswana
- Tasmanian Assessment, Standards and Certification, part of the education system in Tasmania, Australia
- Technology and Social Change Centre (TaSC), University of Essex, England
- Test Assessing Secondary Completion (TASC), a high school equivalency exam developed by CTB/McGraw-Hill
- The Alliance for Safe Children, an American non-profit organisation researching child safety in Asia
- The Analytic Sciences Corporation, Inc., or TASC, Inc., a private defense contractor of Chantilly, Virginia, USA
- Think tank for Action on Social Change, a think tank based in Ireland
- Train Automatic Stopping Controller, a train protection system used in Japan

== See also ==
- Leeds Trinity University, university in Leeds, England, from previous name "Trinity and All Saints College"
