= Arctigenin =

(−)-Arctigenin

Names
- IUPAC name (3R,4R)-4-[(3,4-dimethoxyphenyl)methyl]-3- [(4-hydroxy-3-methoxyphenyl)methyl]-2-tetrahydrofuranone

Identifiers
CAS Number	7770-78-7
3D model (JSmol)	Interactive image; Interactive image
ChEMBL	ChEMBL435734
ChemSpider	58506
KEGG	C10545
MeSH	arctigenin
PubChem CID	64981
UNII	U76MR9VS6M
CompTox Dashboard (EPA)	DTXSID60998919
- InChI: InChI=1S/C21H24O6/c1-24-18-7-5-13(11-20(18)26-3)8-15-12-27-21(23)16(15)9-14-4-6-17(22)19(10-14)25-2/h4-7,10-11,15-16,22H,8-9,12H2,1-3H3/t15-,16+/m0/s1 Key: NQWVSMVXKMHKTF-JKSUJKDBSA-N; InChI=1/C21H24O6/c1-24-18-7-5-13(11-20(18)26-3)8-15-12-27-21(23)16(15)9-14-4-6-17(22)19(10-14)25-2/h4-7,10-11,15-16,22H,8-9,12H2,1-3H3/t15-,16+/m0/s1 Key: NQWVSMVXKMHKTF-JKSUJKDBBB
- SMILES: COC1=C(C=C(C=C1)CC2COC(=O)C2CC3=CC(=C(C=C3)O)OC)OC; O=C2OC[C@H](Cc1cc(OC)c(OC)cc1)[C@H]2Cc3ccc(O)c(OC)c3

Properties
Chemical formula	C_{21}H_{24}O_{6}
Molar mass	372.41166
- Except where otherwise noted, data are given for materials in their standard state (at 25 °C [77 °F], 100 kPa). verify (what is ?) Infobox references

Arctigenin is a lignan found in certain plants of the Asteraceae, including the greater burdock (Arctium lappa) and Saussurea heteromalla. It has shown antiviral and anticancer effects in vitro. It is the aglycone of arctiin.

The use of arctigenin has been shown to be effective in a mouse model of Japanese encephalitis.

It has been found to act as an agonist of adiponectin receptor 1 (AdipoR1).
