= Japanese scientific misconduct allegations =

Allegations of scientific misconduct against several Japanese universities

In 2010s, a series of separate allegations of scientific misconducts were raised involving several scientific papers from various Japanese universities.

== Shigeaki Kato ==
In February 1996, Shigeaki Kato, who had studied in the laboratory of Pierre Chambon, established his laboratory at the Institute for Molecular and Cellular Biology of the University of Tokyo. Kato was one of the most well-funded researchers in Japan and published many papers in prominent journals. From 2007, Kato and one former member of his laboratory taught research ethics at the annual meeting of the Molecular Biology Society of Japan.

In mid-2011, the Kato lab withdrew papers published in The Journal of Steroid Biochemistry and Molecular Biology in 2004 and 2007 due to duplicate publications.

On October 26, 2011, an extensive correction of the Kato laboratory's paper was publicly announced in Nature. The first author of this Nature paper is the former member who taught research ethics at the annual meeting of the Molecular Biology Society of Japan. This correction raised suspicions among some researchers and led to their discovery that 24 of the papers published by Kato's laboratory so far contained a large number of unnatural, highly similar images and traces of modification, as shown in the anonymous 2channel threads, "捏造、不正論文総合スレ 4" and "捏造、不正論文総合スレ 5." 11jigen, a famous anonymous man who had accused hundreds of papers of research misconduct, then created blogs (Japanese and English) and a YouTube video summarizing the points made, and in early January 2012, he sent a letter of accusation to the University of Tokyo. Another letter of accusation was sent by a journal at about the same time.

On March 30, 2012, a Cell paper from Kato's laboratory was retracted. The retraction announcement stated that the first author refused to sign his consent to the retraction.

At the end of March 2012, Kato voluntarily resigned from the University of Tokyo.

On December 11, 2012, three directors of the Molecular Biology Society of Japan, Mitsuhiro Yanagida, Fumio Hanaoka, and Keiichi Nakayama apologized for putting Kato in charge of research ethics.

On July 25, 2013, a scoop article by Shigeko Segawa on the progress of the investigation was published on the top of the front page of The Asahi Shimbun newspaper. This brought the seriousness of the case to the attention of the Japanese people.

On December 26, 2013, the University of Tokyo presented an interim report on the investigation of Kato's laboratory.

On August 1, 2014, the first round of the investigation of Kato's laboratory was reported, which identified five papers as fraudulent and indicated that Kato ordered the falsification of experimental notes in order to avoid the retraction of the papers.

On December 26, 2014, the University of Tokyo released the final report of its investigation. The University of Tokyo found fraud in 33 of the 165 published papers out of the total of 165 papers they had investigated. The President of the University of Tokyo disciplined himself.

Yuji Kohara, a former president of the Molecular Biology Society of Japan, noted in the April 6, 2015 issue of AERA, "Even after reading the investigation report, we cannot determine the cause and process of why there was fraud, and we cannot take real steps to prevent recurrence." On the other hand, Junichi Hamada, President of the University of Tokyo, said, "We interviewed as many as 100 people involved and conducted a careful investigation. It is unavoidable that it took time. To avoid libel in the event of a trial, we cannot speculate on matters for which we have no evidence."

== 2014–2015 anonymous accusations ("Anonymous A") ==
From the end of 2014 to the beginning of 2015, an anonymous accuser (who called themself "Anonymous A") posted comments on an Internet bulletin board created by Shigeru Kondo. This board had been created for the discussion of research ethics at the 2013 annual meeting of Molecular Biology Society of Japan. The Anonymous A's comments revealed that 84 medical papers published in international journals such as Nature from Japanese research institutions between 1996 and 2008 contained image data suspected of being fabricated. The accusation was immediately spread through Japanese web sites, and Japanese major newspapers and NHK began reporting from January 9, 2015. The MEXT, Hirofumi Shimomura, revealed at a post-cabinet press conference on January 13, 2015 that a written anonymous accusation was also sent to them on January 6.

Osaka University, where the largest number of papers, at 28, were identified, conducted a preliminary investigation of all suspected papers, except for one paper authored of a full professor who was formerly accused and fired. The investigation denied suspicion in one paper, determined that seven papers were inadvertently misused, and terminated the investigation for the remaining 19 papers due to a lack of convincing data. The University of Tokyo published a document stating its conclusion only that it had determined that there was no research misconduct. Kyushu University's internal investigation found no admission of wrongdoing.

On May 19, 2015, a question regarding the anonymous accuser's findings was asked by Junya Ogawa, at the Japanese House of Representatives. In answering the question, MEXT Parliamentary Secretary Tomohiro Yamamoto stated that "64 papers, 17 institutions, 33 researchers" were reported not to be fraudulent and "23 papers, 10 institutions, 16 researchers" were still under investigation. In October 2016, Mitsuru Sakurai submitted a question to the Chair of the Japanese House of Councillors, pointing out that the investigation of the University of Tokyo into research misconduct was inadequate. He also uncovered information that the person in charge of the investigation at the University of Tokyo was a researcher who was close to the accused.

One JBC paper published by Kanazawa University was retracted on September 4, 2015. As of August 2017, fourteen papers in the journals, such as Nature, have been corrected.

The same anonymous accuser also appears to have made allegations about other research papers in Japan. As of December 7, 2023, a total of 115 papers have been pointed out, and the corresponding authors of the pointed out papers include three Japanese Nobel Laureates in Physiology or Medicine, one of whom was obliged to make an apologetic press conference. As of December 7, 2023, five papers from major journals that were not mentioned in the 2014-2015 accusations have been corrected after being pointed out.

The allegations against the Dana-Farber Cancer Institute published by Sholto David on January 2, 2024, included one issue identified by "Anonymous A". Sholto David was entitled to receive $2.63 million as a whistleblower.

== Ordinary_researchers ==
Ordinary_researchers refers to an anonymous individual or group that accused research misconduct involving 22 medical and life sciences papers from the University of Tokyo in August 2016.

In the original complaint, dated August 14, 2016, they accused eleven papers from four laboratories of medical professors at the University of Tokyo. The accusation letter is less than 70 pages and specifically pointed out unnatural aspects in images and graphs of papers published in the world's most prestigious journals, including Nature, Cell, and The New England Journal of Medicine, between 2003 and 2015. It states, "In view of the regularity, frequency, fairness, and seriousness of the paper's impact, it should no longer be overlooked."

A second complaint filed on August 29, 2016 accused additional eleven papers from two laboratories, one of which is of a professor of medicine and the other is of a professor of the Institute for Molecular and Cellular Biology at the University of Tokyo. The accusation letter, less than 40 pages long, specifically pointed out unnatural aspects in images and graphs in papers published in the world's top journals, including Nature, Science, and Cell, between 2005 and 2016.

The accusations were repeatedly reported by mass media around the world, including Japan, and the full text of the accusations became public within a month by Science Magazine.

On August 1, 2017, the University of Tokyo announced that it had found misconduct in a total of five papers from the laboratory of the professor at the Institute for Molecular and Cellular Biology and no misconduct in all papers from laboratories of the five professors in the Faculty of Medicine. The Nature paper, which allegedly identified the adiponectin receptors AdipoR1 and AdipoR2 by expression cloning using FACS, was not investigated, citing the fact that a correction notice was issued 13 years ago.

At the press conference, in response to the survey of the Faculty of Medicine that found no irregularities in any of the data, Ms. Masako Takuma said, "If it was a mistake and the data was duplicated, I would still understand. However, it is not possible to add up the data and divide by two without going to the trouble of doing so."

Following the University of Tokyo's announcement, Ordinary_researchers responded to NHK and Science Magazine. As for the investigation into the medical school, Ordinary_researchers pointed out that "there is little concrete information published about what kind of verification was conducted, which makes it impossible for third parties in the scientific community to verify the doubts". Asako Sugimoto, president of the Molecular Biology Society of Japan, said of some of the papers which were not found to be fraudulent, "We believe that they damage the reliability of the researchers."

== List of alleged papers ==
| Case | No. | Journal name | Publication year | DOI | Date of original accusation | Location of original accusation | 11jigen activities | Journal activities | Institute's Decision* | References |
|---|---|---|---|---|---|---|---|---|---|---|
| Kato's lab | 01 | Genes Dev | 2010 | 10.1101/gad.1857410 | 2011-12-27 | 2channel (捏造、不正論文 総合スレ 4) | Created a summary blog. Filed an accusation. | Corrigendum | Not be ruled out as fraud. | |
| Kato's lab | 02 | JBC | 2009 | 10.1074/jbc.M109.009738 | 2011-12-25 | 2channel (捏造、不正論文 総合スレ 4) | Created a summary blog. Filed an accusation. | Retracted | Fraud. The criminal is unknown. | |
| Kato's lab | 03 | Nature | 2009 | 10.1038/nature08456 | Unknown | Unknown | Created a summary blog. Filed an accusation. | Retracted | Fraud. | |
| Kato's lab | 04 | MCB | 2009 | 10.1128/MCB.00884-08 | 2012-01-01 | 2channel (捏造、不正論文 総合スレ 5) | Created a summary blog. Filed an accusation. | Retracted | Fraud. | |
| Kato's lab | 05 | PNAS | 2009 | 10.1073/pnas.0809819106 | 2012-01-01 | 2channel (捏造、不正論文 総合スレ 5) | Created a summary blog. Filed an accusation. | Corrigendum | Not be ruled out as fraud. | |
| Kato's lab | 06 | Genes Cells | 2007 | 10.1111/j.1365-2443.2007.01131.x | 2011-12-23 | 2channel (捏造、不正論文 総合スレ 4) | Created a summary blog. Filed an accusation. | Retracted | Fraud. | |
| Kato's lab | 07 | Nat Cell Biol | 2007 | 10.1038/ncb1647 | 2011-12-24 | 2channel (捏造、不正論文 総合スレ 4) | Created a summary blog. Filed an accusation. | Retracted | Fraud. | |
| Kato's lab | 08 | MCB | 2007 | 10.1128/MCB.02039-06 | 2012-01-01 | 2channel (捏造、不正論文 総合スレ 5) | Created a summary blog. Filed an accusation. | Corrigendum | Not be ruled out as fraud. | |
| Kato's lab | 09 | MCB | 2007 | 10.1128/MCB.00409-07 | 2012-01-01 | 2channel (捏造、不正論文 総合スレ 5) | Created a summary blog. Filed an accusation. | Retracted | Fraud. | |
| Kato's lab | 10 | JBC | 2006 | 10.1074/jbc.M510157200 | 2012-01-01 | 2channel (捏造、不正論文 総合スレ 5) | Created a summary blog. Filed an accusation. | Retracted | Fraud. The criminal is unknown. | |
| Kato's lab | 11 | MCB | 2007 | 10.1128/MCB.00813-07 | 2011-12-31 | 2channel (捏造、不正論文 総合スレ 5) | Created a summary blog. Filed an accusation. | Retracted | Fraud. The criminal is unknown. | |
| Kato's lab | 12 | J Pharmacol Exp Ther | 2005 | 10.1124/jpet.105.087643 | 2012-01-01 | 2channel (捏造、不正論文 総合スレ 5) | Created a summary blog. Filed an accusation. | Retracted | Fraud. | |
| Kato's lab | 13 | J Pharmacol Sci | 2005 | 10.1254/jphs.fmj04008x5 | 2012-01-01 | 2channel (捏造、不正論文 総合スレ 5) | Created a summary blog. Filed an accusation. | Retracted | Not be ruled out as fraud. | |
| Kato's lab | 14 | Genes Cells | 2004 | 10.1111/j.1365-2443.2004.00777.x | 2012-01-01 | 2channel (捏造、不正論文 総合スレ 5) | Created a summary blog. Filed an accusation. | Retracted | Not be ruled out as fraud. | |
| Kato's lab | 15 | EMBO J | 2004 | 10.1038/sj.emboj.7600157 | 2012-01-01 | 2channel (捏造、不正論文 総合スレ 5) | Created a summary blog. Filed an accusation. | Retracted | Fraud. The criminal is unknown. | |
| Kato's lab | 16 | Cell | 2003 | 10.1016/s0092-8674(03)00436-7 | 2011-12-24 | 2channel (捏造、不正論文 総合スレ 4) | Created a summary blog. Filed an accusation. | Retracted | Fraud. | |
| Kato's lab | 17 | Nature | 2003 | 10.1038/nature01606 | 2011-12-25 | 2channel (捏造、不正論文 総合スレ 4) | Created a summary blog. Filed an accusation. | None | Not be ruled out as fraud. | |
| Kato's lab | 18 | Nat Cell Biol | 2003 | 10.1038/ncb942 | 2011-12-24 | 2channel (捏造、不正論文 総合スレ 4) | Created a summary blog. Filed an accusation. | Retracted | Fraud. | |
| Kato's lab | 19 | MCB | 2002 | 10.1128/MCB.22.11.3698-3706.2002 | 2011-12-23 | 2channel (捏造、不正論文 総合スレ 4) | Created a summary blog. Filed an accusation. | Retracted | Fraud. The criminal is unknown. | |
| Kato's lab | 20 | NAR | 2002 | 10.1093/nar/30.6.1387 | 2011-12-26 | 2channel (捏造、不正論文 総合スレ 4) | Created a summary blog. Filed an accusation. | None | Not be ruled out as fraud. | |
| Kato's lab | 21 | Neuron | 2002 | 10.1016/s0896-6273(02)00875-9 | 2011-12-28 | 2channel (捏造、不正論文 総合スレ 5) | Created a summary blog. Filed an accusation. | None | Not be ruled out as fraud. | |
| Kato's lab | 22 | EMBO J | 2001 | 10.1093/emboj/20.6.1341 | 2011-12-25 | 2channel (捏造、不正論文 総合スレ 4) | Created a summary blog. Filed an accusation. | Retracted | Fraud. The criminal is unknown. | |
| Kato's lab | 23 | JBC | 1999 | 10.1074/jbc.274.19.12971 | 2013-12-26 | Interim report of University of Tokyo | None | Retracted | Fraud. The criminal is unknown. | |
| Kato's lab | 24 | BBRC | 1996 | 10.1006/bbrc.1996.0755 | 2013-12-26 | Interim report of University of Tokyo | None | None | Not be ruled out as fraud. | |
| Kato's lab | 25 | BBRC | 2004 | 10.1016/j.bbrc.2004.05.157 | 2013-12-26 | Interim report of University of Tokyo | None | None | Not be ruled out as fraud. | |
| Kato's lab | 26 | MCB | 2009 | 10.1128/MCB.02123-07 | 2013-12-26 | Interim report of University of Tokyo | None | Corrigendum | Not be ruled out as fraud. | |
| Kato's lab | 27 | EMBO J | 2005 | 10.1038/sj.emboj.7600853 | 2013-12-26 | Interim report of University of Tokyo | None | Retracted | Fraud. | |
| Kato's lab | 28 | Mol Cell Endocrinol | 2007 | 10.1016/j.mce.2006.12.014 | 2013-12-26 | Interim report of University of Tokyo | None | Retracted | Fraud. | |
| Kato's lab | 29 | Genes Cells | 2008 | 10.1111/j.1365-2443.2008.01244.x | 2013-12-26 | Interim report of University of Tokyo | None | Retracted | Fraud. | |
| Kato's lab | 30 | Mol Cell | 2002 | 10.1016/s1097-2765(02)00478-1 | 2013-12-26 | Interim report of University of Tokyo | None | Retracted | Fraud. | |
| Kato's lab | 31 | Endocrinology | 1999 | 10.1210/endo.140.5.6691 | 2013-12-26 | Interim report of University of Tokyo | None | None | Not be ruled out as fraud. | |
| Kato's lab | 32 | JBC | 2001 | 10.1074/jbc.M107844200 | 2013-12-26 | Interim report of University of Tokyo | None | Retracted | Fraud. The criminal is unknown. | |
| Kato's lab | 33 | BBRC | 2002 | 10.1016/S0006-291X(02)00564-8 | 2013-12-26 | Interim report of University of Tokyo | None | None | Fraud. | |
| Kato's lab | 34 | PNAS | 2004 | 10.1073/pnas.0305303101 | 2013-12-26 | Interim report of University of Tokyo | None | None | Not be ruled out as fraud. | |
| Kato's lab | 35 | Oncogene | 2004 | 10.1038/sj.onc.1207786 | 2013-12-26 | Interim report of University of Tokyo | None | Retracted | Fraud. The criminal is unknown. | |
| Kato's lab | 36 | Genes Cells | 2005 | 10.1111/j.1365-2443.2005.00904.x | 2013-12-26 | Interim report of University of Tokyo | None | Retracted | Fraud. The criminal is unknown. | |
| Kato's lab | 37 | EMBO J | 2007 | 10.1038/sj.emboj.7601548 | 2013-12-26 | Interim report of University of Tokyo | None | Retracted | Fraud. The criminal is unknown. | |
| Kato's lab | 38 | Nature | 2007 | 10.1038/nature05683 | 2013-12-26 | Interim report of University of Tokyo | None | None | Not be ruled out as fraud. | |
| Kato's lab | 39 | Arch Biochem Biophys | 2007 | 10.1016/j.abb.2006.07.015 | 2013-12-26 | Interim report of University of Tokyo | None | Retracted | Fraud. The criminal is unknown. | |
| Kato's lab | 40 | EMBO Rep | 2008 | 10.1038/embor.2008.55 | 2013-12-26 | Interim report of University of Tokyo | None | Retracted | Not be ruled out as fraud. | |
| Kato's lab | 41 | Nature | 2009 | 10.1038/nature07954 | 2013-12-26 | Interim report of University of Tokyo | None | Retracted | Fraud. | |
| Kato's lab | 42 | PNAS | 2009 | 10.1073/pnas.0901184106 | 2013-12-26 | Interim report of University of Tokyo | None | Retracted | Fraud. The criminal is unknown. | |
| Kato's lab | 43 | JBC | 2010 | 10.1074/jbc.M109.077024 | 2013-12-26 | Interim report of University of Tokyo | None | Retracted | Fraud. The criminal is unknown. | |
| Kato's lab | 44 | PNAS | 2010 | 10.1073/pnas.1010307107 | 2013-12-26 | Interim report of University of Tokyo | None | Retracted | Fraud. The criminal is unknown. | |
| Kato's lab | 45 | Cold Spring Harb Symp Quant Biol | 2011 | 10.1101/sqb.2011.76.010736 | 2013-12-26 | Interim report of University of Tokyo | None | None | Not be ruled out as fraud. | |
| Kato's lab | 46 | Mol Cell | 2009 | 10.1016/j.molcel.2009.08.017 | 2013-12-26 | Interim report of University of Tokyo | None | Retracted | Fraud. | |
| Kato's lab | 47 | MCB | 1999 | 10.1128/MCB.19.8.5363 | 2013-12-26 | Interim report of University of Tokyo | None | Retracted | Fraud. The criminal is unknown. | |
| Kato's lab | 48 | JBC | 2000 | 10.1074/jbc.C000517200 | 2013-12-26 | Interim report of University of Tokyo | None | Retracted | Fraud. The criminal is unknown. | |
| Kato's lab | 49 | PNAS | 2006 | 10.1073/pnas.0506736102 | 2013-12-26 | Interim report of University of Tokyo | None | None | Not be ruled out as fraud. | |
| Kato's lab | 50 | Nat Cell Biol | 2007 | 10.1038/ncb1577 | 2013-12-26 | Interim report of University of Tokyo | None | Retracted | Fraud. The criminal is unknown. | |
| Kato's lab | 51 | BBRC | 2010 | 10.1016/j.bbrc.2010.02.167 | 2013-12-26 | Interim report of University of Tokyo | None | None | Not be ruled out as fraud. | |
| "Anonymous A" | #001 | Nature | 1998 | 10.1038/34214 | 2014-12-30 | Kondo's board (捏造問題にもっと怒りを) | Mentioned on Twitter | Corrigendum | Officially unknown. | |
| "Anonymous A" | #002 | JBC | 2000 | 10.1074/jbc.275.11.8091 | 2014-12-30 | Kondo's board (捏造問題にもっと怒りを) | Mentioned on Twitter | None | Officially unknown. | |
| "Anonymous A" | #003 | Arch Biochem Biophys | 2001 | 10.1006/abbi.2000.2266 | 2014-12-30 | Kondo's board (捏造問題にもっと怒りを) | Mentioned on Twitter | None | Officially unknown. | |
| "Anonymous A" | #004 | Diabetes | 2002 | 10.2337/diabetes.51.10.2915 | 2014-12-30 | Kondo's board (捏造問題にもっと怒りを) | Mentioned on Twitter | None | Officially unknown. | |
| "Anonymous A" | #005 | Nat Med | 2002 | 10.1038/nm724 | 2014-12-30 | Kondo's board (捏造問題にもっと怒りを) | Mentioned on Twitter | None | Officially unknown. | |
| "Anonymous A" | #006 | JBC | 2003 | 10.1074/jbc.M213202200 | 2014-12-30 | Kondo's board (捏造問題にもっと怒りを) | Mentioned on Twitter | None | Officially unknown. | |
| "Anonymous A" | #007 | MBC | 1996 | 10.1128/MCB.16.6.3074 | 2014-12-31 | Kondo's board (捏造問題にもっと怒りを) | Mentioned on Twitter | None | Not be ruled out as fraud. | |
| "Anonymous A" | #008 | JBC | 2003 | 10.1074/jbc.M103241200 | 2014-12-31 | Kondo's board (捏造問題にもっと怒りを) | Mentioned on Twitter | None | Not be ruled out as fraud. | |
| "Anonymous A" | #009 | J Clin Invest | 2001 | 10.1172/JCI12864 | 2014-12-31 | Kondo's board (捏造問題にもっと怒りを) | Mentioned on Twitter | None | Not be ruled out as fraud. | |
| "Anonymous A" | #010 | Nat Genet | 2002 | 10.1038/ng829 | 2014-12-31 | Kondo's board (捏造問題にもっと怒りを) | Mentioned on Twitter | None | Not be ruled out as fraud. | |
| "Anonymous A" | #011 | BBRC | 2004 | 10.1016/j.bbrc.2004.08.083 | 2014-12-31 | Kondo's board (捏造問題にもっと怒りを) | Mentioned on Twitter | None | Not be ruled out as fraud. | |
| "Anonymous A" | #012 | JBC | 2001 | 10.1074/jbc.M101781200 | 2015-01-01 | Kondo's board (捏造問題にもっと怒りを) | Mentioned on Twitter | None | Not be ruled out as fraud. | |
| "Anonymous A" | #013 | Exp Cell Res | 2002 | 10.1006/excr.2001.5394 | 2015-01-01 | Kondo's board (捏造問題にもっと怒りを) | Mentioned on Twitter | None | Not be ruled out as fraud. | |
| "Anonymous A" | #014 | Oncogene | 2002 | 10.1038/sj.onc.1205114 | 2015-01-01 | Kondo's board (捏造問題にもっと怒りを) | Mentioned on Twitter | None | Not be ruled out as fraud. | |
| "Anonymous A" | #015 | BBRC | 2002 | 10.1016/S0006-291X(02)00216-4 | 2015-01-01 | Kondo's board (捏造問題にもっと怒りを) | Mentioned on Twitter | None | Not be ruled out as fraud. | |
| "Anonymous A" | #016 | J Virol | 1999 | 10.1128/JVI.73.11.9237-9246.1999 | 2015-01-01 | Kondo's board (捏造問題にもっと怒りを) | Mentioned on Twitter | None | Not be ruled out as fraud. | |
| "Anonymous A" | #017 | J Virol | 2000 | 10.1128/jvi.74.12.5619-5628.2000 | 2015-01-01 | Kondo's board (捏造問題にもっと怒りを) | Mentioned on Twitter | None | Officially unknown. | |
| "Anonymous A" | #018 | J Virol | 2001 | 10.1128/JVI.75.8.3802-3810.2001 | 2015-01-01 | Kondo's board (捏造問題にもっと怒りを) | Mentioned on Twitter | None | Officially unknown. | |
| "Anonymous A" | #019 | J Virol | 2002 | 10.1128/jvi.76.14.7114-7124.2002 | 2015-01-01 | Kondo's board (捏造問題にもっと怒りを) | Mentioned on Twitter | None | Officially unknown. | |
| "Anonymous A" | #020 | J Virol | 2004 | 10.1128/JVI.78.14.7443-7454.2004 | 2015-01-01 | Kondo's board (捏造問題にもっと怒りを) | Mentioned on Twitter | None | Officially unknown. | |
| "Anonymous A" | #021 | J Virol | 2007 | 10.1128/JVI.02590-06 | 2015-01-01 | Kondo's board (捏造問題にもっと怒りを) | Mentioned on Twitter | None | Officially unknown. | |
| "Anonymous A" | #022 | BBRC | 2002 | 10.1016/s0006-291x(02)00855-0 | 2015-01-01 | Kondo's board (捏造問題にもっと怒りを) | Mentioned on Twitter | None | Not be ruled out as fraud. | |
| "Anonymous A" | #023 | BBRC | 2001 | 10.1006/bbrc.2001.6003 | 2015-01-01 | Kondo's board (捏造問題にもっと怒りを) | Mentioned on Twitter | None | Not be ruled out as fraud. | |
| "Anonymous A" | #024 | Circ Res | 2004 | 10.1161/01.RES.0000129701.14494.52 | 2015-01-01 | Kondo's board (捏造問題にもっと怒りを) | Mentioned on Twitter | None | Officially unknown. | |
| "Anonymous A" | #025 | JBC | 2002 | 10.1074/jbc.M108138200 | 2015-01-01 | Kondo's board (捏造問題にもっと怒りを) | Mentioned on Twitter | None | Officially unknown. | |
| "Anonymous A" | #026 | JBC | 1999 | 10.1074/jbc.274.17.11995 | 2015-01-01 | Kondo's board (捏造問題にもっと怒りを) | Mentioned on Twitter | None | Officially unknown. | |
| "Anonymous A" | #027 | JBC | 2000 | 10.1074/jbc.C000212200 | 2015-01-01 | Kondo's board (捏造問題にもっと怒りを) | Mentioned on Twitter | None | Not be ruled out as fraud. | |
| "Anonymous A" | #028 | JBC | 2002 | 10.1074/jbc.M209356200 | 2015-01-01 | Kondo's board (捏造問題にもっと怒りを) | Mentioned on Twitter | Corrigendum | Unknown. | |
| "Anonymous A" | #029 | JBC | 2001 | 10.1074/jbc.M008744200 | 2015-01-01 | Kondo's board (捏造問題にもっと怒りを) | Mentioned on Twitter | None | Unknown. | |
| "Anonymous A" | #030 | JBC | 1999 | 10.1074/jbc.274.53.38251 | 2015-01-01 | Kondo's board (捏造問題にもっと怒りを) | Mentioned on Twitter | None | Officially unknown. | |
| "Anonymous A" | #031 | Nucleic Acids Res | 2000 | 10.1093/nar/28.6.1355 | 2015-01-01 | Kondo's board (捏造問題にもっと怒りを) | Mentioned on Twitter | Corrigendum | Officially unknown. | |
| "Anonymous A" | #032 | DNA Repair | 2007 | 10.1016/j.dnarep.2007.01.003 | 2015-01-01 | Kondo's board (捏造問題にもっと怒りを) | Mentioned on Twitter | None | Officially unknown. | |
| "Anonymous A" | #033 | JBC | 2000 | 10.1074/jbc.M001144200 | 2015-01-01 | Kondo's board (捏造問題にもっと怒りを) | Mentioned on Twitter | None | Officially unknown. | |
| "Anonymous A" | #034 | JBC | 2002 | 10.1074/jbc.C100762200 | 2015-01-01 | Kondo's board (捏造問題にもっと怒りを) | Mentioned on Twitter | Corrigendum | Officially unknown. | |
| "Anonymous A" | #035 | EMBO J | 2002 | 10.1093/emboj/cdf642 | 2015-01-01 | Kondo's board (捏造問題にもっと怒りを) | Mentioned on Twitter | Corrigendum | Officially unknown. | |
| "Anonymous A" | #036 | JBC | 2003 | 10.1074/jbc.M212856200 | 2015-01-01 | Kondo's board (捏造問題にもっと怒りを) | Mentioned on Twitter | Corrigendum | Officially unknown. | |
| "Anonymous A" | #037 | JBC | 2003 | 10.1074/jbc.M302868200 | 2015-01-01 | Kondo's board (捏造問題にもっと怒りを) | Mentioned on Twitter | None | Officially unknown. | |
| "Anonymous A" | #038 | J Virol | 1999 | 10.1128/JVI.73.10.7981-7987.1999 | 2015-01-02 | Kondo's board (捏造問題にもっと怒りを) | Mentioned on Twitter | None | Unknown. | |
| "Anonymous A" | #039 | JBC | 2002 | 10.1074/jbc.M106880200 | 2015-01-02 | Kondo's board (捏造問題にもっと怒りを) | Mentioned on Twitter | Retracted | Officially unknown. | |
| "Anonymous A" | #040 | JBC | 2004 | 10.1074/jbc.M401067200 | 2015-01-02 | Kondo's board (捏造問題にもっと怒りを) | Mentioned on Twitter | None | Officially unknown. | |
| "Anonymous A" | #041 | Diabetes | 2003 | 10.2337/diabetes.52.11.2657 | 2015-01-02 | Kondo's board (捏造問題にもっと怒りを) | Mentioned on Twitter | Corrigendum | Not be ruled out as fraud. | |
| "Anonymous A" | #042 | JBC | 1999 | 10.1074/jbc.274.45.32309 | 2015-01-02 | Kondo's board (捏造問題にもっと怒りを) | Mentioned on Twitter | None | Completely innocent. | |
| "Anonymous A" | #043 | JBC | 2000 | 10.1074/jbc.M909999199 | 2015-01-02 | Kondo's board (捏造問題にもっと怒りを) | Mentioned on Twitter | None | Unknown. | |
| "Anonymous A" | #044 | JBC | 2000 | 10.1074/jbc.275.6.4369 | 2015-01-02 | Kondo's board (捏造問題にもっと怒りを) | Mentioned on Twitter | None | Unknown. | |
| "Anonymous A" | #045 | Hepatology | 2000 | 10.1053/jhep.2000.18715 | 2015-01-02 | Kondo's board (捏造問題にもっと怒りを) | Mentioned on Twitter | None | Unknown. | |
| "Anonymous A" | #046 | J Hepatol | 2004 | 10.1016/j.jhep.2003.12.018 | 2015-01-02 | Kondo's board (捏造問題にもっと怒りを) | Mentioned on Twitter | None | Unknown. | |
| "Anonymous A" | #047 | Am J Physiol Endocrinol Metab | 2005 | 10.1152/ajpendo.00118.2004 | 2015-01-02 | Kondo's board (捏造問題にもっと怒りを) | Mentioned on Twitter | Corrigendum | Unknown. | |
| "Anonymous A" | #048 | BBRC | 2001 | 10.1006/bbrc.2001.4764 | 2015-01-02 | Kondo's board (捏造問題にもっと怒りを) | Mentioned on Twitter | None | Not be ruled out as fraud. | |
| "Anonymous A" | #049 | J Virol | 2002 | 10.1128/jvi.76.24.12683-12690.2002 | 2015-01-02 | Kondo's board (捏造問題にもっと怒りを) | Mentioned on Twitter | Corrigendum | Not be ruled out as fraud. | |
| "Anonymous A" | #050 | JBC | 2003 | 10.1074/jbc.M305701200 | 2015-01-02 | Kondo's board (捏造問題にもっと怒りを) | Mentioned on Twitter | None | Not be ruled out as fraud. | |
| "Anonymous A" | #051 | J Med Virol | 2006 | 10.1002/jmv.20556 | 2015-01-02 | Kondo's board (捏造問題にもっと怒りを) | Mentioned on Twitter | None | Not be ruled out as fraud. | |
| "Anonymous A" | #052 | Cancer Lett | 1999 | 10.1016/s0304-3835(99)00109-3 | 2015-01-02 | Kondo's board (捏造問題にもっと怒りを) | Mentioned on Twitter | None | Unknown. | |
| "Anonymous A" | #053 | Leukemia | 2000 | 10.1038/sj.leu.2401828 | 2015-01-02 | Kondo's board (捏造問題にもっと怒りを) | Mentioned on Twitter | Corrigendum | Unknown. | |
| "Anonymous A" | #054 | BBRC | 2004 | 10.1016/j.bbrc.2004.02.080 | 2015-01-02 | Kondo's board (捏造問題にもっと怒りを) | Mentioned on Twitter | None | Unknown. | |
| "Anonymous A" | #055 | Cancer Lett | 2008 | 10.1016/j.canlet.2007.11.017 | 2015-01-02 | Kondo's board (捏造問題にもっと怒りを) | Mentioned on Twitter | Corrigendum | Unknown. | |
| "Anonymous A" | #056 | Cancer Res | 2006 | 10.1158/0008-5472.CAN-06-0377 | 2015-01-02 | Kondo's board (捏造問題にもっと怒りを) | Mentioned on Twitter | Corrigendum | Not be ruled out as fraud. | |
| "Anonymous A" | #057 | BBRC | 2005 | 10.1016/j.bbrc.2005.01.086 | 2015-01-02 | Kondo's board (捏造問題にもっと怒りを) | Mentioned on Twitter | None | Completely innocent. | |
| "Anonymous A" | #058 | BBRC | 2000 | 10.1006/bbrc.2000.3200 | 2015-01-02 | Kondo's board (捏造問題にもっと怒りを) | Mentioned on Twitter | None | Unknown. | |
| "Anonymous A" | #059 | BBRC | 2001 | 10.1006/bbrc.2001.4844 | 2015-01-02 | Kondo's board (捏造問題にもっと怒りを) | Mentioned on Twitter | None | Unknown. | |
| "Anonymous A" | #060 | Nat Cell Biol | 1999 | 10.1038/70265 | 2015-01-03 | Kondo's board (捏造問題にもっと怒りを) | Mentioned on Twitter | None | Officially unknown. | |
| "Anonymous A" | #061 | JBC | 2001 | 10.1074/jbc.M006886200 | 2015-01-03 | Kondo's board (捏造問題にもっと怒りを) | Mentioned on Twitter | None | Officially unknown. | |
| "Anonymous A" | #062 | JBC | 2001 | 10.1074/jbc.M104096200 | 2015-01-03 | Kondo's board (捏造問題にもっと怒りを) | Mentioned on Twitter | None | Officially unknown. | |
| "Anonymous A" | #063 | JBC | 2002 | 10.1074/jbc.M110795200 | 2015-01-03 | Kondo's board (捏造問題にもっと怒りを) | Mentioned on Twitter | None | Officially unknown. | |
| "Anonymous A" | #064 | Circulation | 2002 | 10.1161/01.cir.0000018622.84402.ff | 2015-01-03 | Kondo's board (捏造問題にもっと怒りを) | Mentioned on Twitter | None | Officially unknown. | |
| "Anonymous A" | #065 | JBC | 2002 | 10.1074/jbc.M111501200 | 2015-01-03 | Kondo's board (捏造問題にもっと怒りを) | Mentioned on Twitter | None | Officially unknown. | |
| "Anonymous A" | #066 | JBC | 2005 | 10.1074/jbc.M406788200 | 2015-01-03 | Kondo's board (捏造問題にもっと怒りを) | Mentioned on Twitter | None | Officially unknown. | |
| "Anonymous A" | #067 | JBC | 2005 | 10.1074/jbc.M413461200 | 2015-01-03 | Kondo's board (捏造問題にもっと怒りを) | Mentioned on Twitter | None | Officially unknown. | |
| "Anonymous A" | #068 | JBC | 2001 | 10.1074/jbc.M006153200 | 2015-01-03 | Kondo's board (捏造問題にもっと怒りを) | Mentioned on Twitter | None | Officially unknown. | |
| "Anonymous A" | #069 | JBC | 2001 | 10.1074/jbc.M103853200 | 2015-01-03 | Kondo's board (捏造問題にもっと怒りを) | Mentioned on Twitter | None | Officially unknown. | |
| "Anonymous A" | #070 | JBC | 2001 | 10.1074/jbc.M005036200 | 2015-01-03 | Kondo's board (捏造問題にもっと怒りを) | Mentioned on Twitter | None | Officially unknown. | |
| "Anonymous A" | #071 | JBC | 2002 | 10.1074/jbc.M204042200 | 2015-01-03 | Kondo's board (捏造問題にもっと怒りを) | Mentioned on Twitter | None | Officially unknown. | |
| "Anonymous A" | #072 | Endocrinology | 2004 | 10.1210/en.2003-0792 | 2015-01-03 | Kondo's board (捏造問題にもっと怒りを) | Mentioned on Twitter | None | Officially unknown. | |
| "Anonymous A" | #073 | Clin Cancer Res | 2004 | 10.1158/1078-0432.CCR-04-0958 | 2015-01-03 | Kondo's board (捏造問題にもっと怒りを) | Mentioned on Twitter | None | Officially unknown. | |
| "Anonymous A" | #074 | Endocrinology | 2004 | 10.1210/en.2003-0709 | 2015-01-03 | Kondo's board (捏造問題にもっと怒りを) | Mentioned on Twitter | None | Officially unknown. | |
| "Anonymous A" | #075 | JBC | 2004 | 10.1074/jbc.M313709200 | 2015-01-03 | Kondo's board (捏造問題にもっと怒りを) | Mentioned on Twitter | None | Officially unknown. | |
| "Anonymous A" | #076 | JBC | 2000 | 10.1074/jbc.M003491200 | 2015-01-03 | Kondo's board (捏造問題にもっと怒りを) | Mentioned on Twitter | None | Officially unknown. | |
| "Anonymous A" | #077 | PNAS | 2000 | 10.1073/pnas.240303097 | 2015-01-03 | Kondo's board (捏造問題にもっと怒りを) | Mentioned on Twitter | Corrigendum | Officially unknown. | |
| "Anonymous A" | #078 | JBC | 1999 | 10.1074/jbc.274.13.8531 | 2015-01-03 | Kondo's board (捏造問題にもっと怒りを) | Mentioned on Twitter | None | Officially unknown. | |
| "Anonymous A" | #079 | FASEB J | 2001 | 10.1096/fj.00-0495fje | 2015-01-03 | Kondo's board (捏造問題にもっと怒りを) | Mentioned on Twitter | None | Officially unknown. | |
| "Anonymous A" | #080 | Nat Med | 2001 | 10.1038/85463 | 2015-01-03 | Kondo's board (捏造問題にもっと怒りを) | Mentioned on Twitter | None | Officially unknown. | |
| "Anonymous A" | #081 | JBC | 2003 | 10.1074/jbc.M207880200 | 2015-01-03 | Kondo's board (捏造問題にもっと怒りを) | Mentioned on Twitter | Corrigendum | Officially unknown. | |
| "Anonymous A" | #082 | JBC | 2001 | 10.1074/jbc.M103848200 | 2015-01-03 | Kondo's board (捏造問題にもっと怒りを) | Mentioned on Twitter | None | Not be ruled out as fraud. | |
| "Anonymous A" | #083 | JBC | 2005 | 10.1074/jbc.M409969200 | 2015-01-03 | Kondo's board (捏造問題にもっと怒りを) | Mentioned on Twitter | None | Not be ruled out as fraud. | |
| "Anonymous A" | #084 | Cancer Res | 2007 | 10.1158/0008-5472.CAN-06-2756 | 2015-01-03 | Kondo's board (捏造問題にもっと怒りを) | Mentioned on Twitter | None | Not be ruled out as fraud. | |
| "Anonymous A" | #085 | Nature | 2008 | 10.1038/nature07027 | 2013-03-05 | 2channel (捏造、不正論文 総合スレネオ1) | Created a summary blog. Filed an accusation. | Corrigendum | Unknown. | |
| "Anonymous A" | #086 | JBC | 2004 | 10.1074/jbc.M310822200 | 2013-03-07 | 2channel (捏造、不正論文 総合スレネオ1) | Created a summary blog. Filed an accusation. | Corrigendum | Unknown. | |
| "Anonymous A" | #087 | Nat Med | 2009 | 10.1038/nm.2014 | 2013-03-08 | 2channel (捏造、不正論文 総合スレネオ1) | Created a summary blog. Filed an accusation. | Corrigendum | Unknown. | |
| "Anonymous A" | #088 | Nat Cell Biol | 2004 | 10.1038/ncb1137 | 2013-03-08 2013-03-11 | 2channel (捏造、不正論文 総合スレネオ1) | Created a summary blog. Filed an accusation. | None | Unknown. | |
| "Anonymous A" | #089 | BBRC | 2004 | 10.1016/j.bbrc.2004.07.119 | 2013-03-21 | 2channel (捏造、不正論文 総合スレネオ1) | Created a summary blog. Filed an accusation. | None | Unknown. | |
| "Anonymous A" | #090 | JBC | 1999 | 10.1074/jbc.274.12.8231 | 2013-03-22 | 2channel (捏造、不正論文 総合スレネオ1) | Created a summary blog. Filed an accusation. | None | Unknown. | |
| "Anonymous A" | #091 | BBRC | 2000 | 10.1006/bbrc.2000.2561 | 2013-03-22 | 2channel (捏造、不正論文 総合スレネオ1) | None | None | Unknown. | |
| "Anonymous A" | #092 | Circulation | 1999 | 10.1161/01.cir.100.20.2100 | 2013-03-27 | 2channel (捏造、不正論文 総合スレネオ2) | Created a summary blog. Filed an accusation. | None | Unknown. | |
| "Anonymous A" | #093 | Circulation | 2003 | 10.1161/01.CIR.0000101923.54751.77 | 2013-03-27 | 2channel (捏造、不正論文 総合スレネオ2) | Created a summary blog. Filed an accusation. | None | Unknown. | |
| "Anonymous A" | #094 | Circulation | 1998 | 10.1161/01.cir.97.19.1952 | 2013-03-28 | 2channel (捏造、不正論文 総合スレネオ2) | None | None | Unknown. | |
| "Anonymous A" | #095 | Circ Res | 1999 | 10.1161/01.res.84.4.458 | 2013-03-28 | 2channel (捏造、不正論文 総合スレネオ2) | None | None | Unknown. | |
| "Anonymous A" | #096 | EMBO J | 2000 | doi.org/10.1093/emboj/19.20.5533 | 2013-03-30 2013-04-06 | 2channel (捏造、不正論文 総合スレネオ2) | Created a summary blog. | None | Not be ruled out as fraud. | |
| "Anonymous A" | #097 | Hypertension | 1998 | 10.1161/01.hyp.31.1.50 | 2013-04-16 | 2channel (捏造、不正論文 総合スレネオ2) | Created a summary blog. Filed an accusation. | None | Fraud. | |
| "Anonymous A" | #098 | Circ Res | 1998 | 10.1161/01.res.83.7.752 | 2013-04-16 | 2channel (捏造、不正論文 総合スレネオ2) | Created a summary blog. Filed an accusation. | None | Fraud. | |
| "Anonymous A" | #099 | J Am Soc Nephrol | 2003 | 10.1097/01.asn.0000050415.97942.2f | 2013-04-16 | 2channel (捏造、不正論文 総合スレネオ2) | Created a summary blog. Filed an accusation. | None | Fraud. | |
| "Anonymous A" | #100 | Hypertens Res | 2005 | 10.1291/hypres.28.447 | 2013-05-07 | 2channel (捏造、不正論文 総合スレネオ3) | Created a summary blog. Filed an accusation. | Corrigendum | Fraud. | |
| "Anonymous A" | #101 | J Pharmacol Sci | 2005 | 10.1254/jphs.fp0050160 | 2013-05-07 | 2channel (捏造、不正論文 総合スレネオ3) | Created a summary blog. Filed an accusation. | None | Fraud. | |
| "Anonymous A" | #102 | Circulation | 2003 | 10.1161/01.cir.0000055331.41937.aa | 2013-08-20 | 2channel (捏造、不正論文 総合スレネオ6) | Mentioned on Twitter | None | Unknown. | |
| "Anonymous A" | #103 | Hypertension | 2006 | 10.1161/01.HYP.0000240266.26185.57 | 2013-08-20 | 2channel (捏造、不正論文 総合スレネオ6) | Mentioned on Twitter | None | Unknown. | |
| "Anonymous A" | #104 | Mol Pharmacol | 2005 | 10.1124/mol.104.008144 | 2013-08-21 | 2channel (捏造、不正論文 総合スレネオ6) | Mentioned on Twitter | None | Unknown. | |
| "Anonymous A" | #105 | Arterioscler Thromb Vasc | 2012 | 10.1161/ATVBAHA.112.249516 | 2013-08-21 | 2channel (捏造、不正論文 総合スレネオ6) | None | Corrigendum | Unknown. | |
| "Anonymous A" | #106 | Nature | 1998 | 10.1038/27945 | 2014-01-23 | Molecular Biology Society of Japan's board | None | None | Unknown. | |
| "Anonymous A" | #107 | Circulation | 2006 | 10.1161/CIRCULATIONAHA.106.626606 | 2013-03-27 | 2channel (捏造、不正論文 総合スレネオ2) | Created a summary blog. Filed an accusation. | None | Unknown. | |
| "Anonymous A" | #108 | Circulation | 2002 | 10.1161/01.cir.0000027823.07104.86 | 2013-03-27 | 2channel (捏造、不正論文 総合スレネオ2) | Created a summary blog. Filed an accusation. | None | Unknown. | |
| "Anonymous A" | #109 | Circulation | 2002 | 10.1161/hc1002.105225 | 2013-03-20 | 2channel (捏造、不正論文 総合スレネオ1) | Created a summary blog. Filed an accusation. | None | Unknown. | |
| "Anonymous A" | #110 | Arthritis Rheum | 2000 | 10.1002/1529-0131(200002)43:2<259::AID-ANR4>3.0.CO;2-W | 2013-03-31 | 2channel (捏造、不正論文 総合スレネオ2) | None | None | Unknown. | |
| "Anonymous A" | #111 | J Clin Invest | 1999 | 10.1172/JCI6093 | 2013-04-01 | 2channel (捏造、不正論文 総合スレネオ2) | None | None | Unknown. | |
| "Anonymous A" | #112 | JBC | 2006 | 10.1074/jbc.M601645200 | 2018-10-26 | 2channel (捏造、不正論文 総合スレネオ47) | None | Retracted | Already retracted. | |
| "Anonymous A" | #113 | PNAS | 2002 | 10.1073/pnas.232562799 | 2019-04-24 | 2channel (捏造、不正論文 総合スレネオ49) | None | None | Unknown. | |
| "Anonymous A" | #114 | Front Microbiol | 2020 | 10.3389/fmicb.2020.628281 | 2021-08-23 | 2channel (捏造、不正論文 総合スレネオ62) | None | None | Unknown. | |
| "Anonymous A" | #115 | BBRC | 2004 | 10.1016/j.bbrc.2003.12.104 | 2023-12-07 | 2channel (捏造、不正論文 総合スレネオ66) | None | None | Unknown. | |
| "Ordinary_researchers" | ##01 | Nature | 2003 | 10.1038/nature01705 | 2016-08-14 | letter to University of Tokyo | None | None | Not be ruled out as fraud. | |
| "Ordinary_researchers" | ##02 | Nat Med | 2007 | 10.1038/nm1557 | 2016-08-14 | letter to University of Tokyo | None | None | Not be ruled out as fraud. | |
| "Ordinary_researchers" | ##03 | Diabetologia | 2008 | 10.1007/s00125-008-0944-9 | 2016-08-14 | letter to University of Tokyo | None | None | Not be ruled out as fraud. | |
| "Ordinary_researchers" | ##04 | Nature | 2010 | 10.1038/nature08991 | 2016-08-14 | letter to University of Tokyo | None | None | Not be ruled out as fraud. | |
| "Ordinary_researchers" | ##05 | Cell Metab | 2011 | 10.1016/j.cmet.2011.02.010 | 2016-08-14 | letter to University of Tokyo | None | None | Not be ruled out as fraud. | |
| "Ordinary_researchers" | ##06 | Diabetologia | 2012 | 10.1007/s00125-012-2711-1 | 2016-08-14 | letter to University of Tokyo | None | None | Not be ruled out as fraud. | |
| "Ordinary_researchers" | ##07 | Nature | 2013 | 10.1038/nature12656 | 2016-08-14 | letter to University of Tokyo | None | None | Not be ruled out as fraud. | |
| "Ordinary_researchers" | ##08 | Nat Med | 2011 | 10.1038/nm.2337 | 2016-08-14 | letter to University of Tokyo | None | None | Not be ruled out as fraud. | |
| "Ordinary_researchers" | ##09 | N Engl J Med | 2013 | 10.1056/NEJMoa1212115 | 2016-08-14 | letter to University of Tokyo | None | None | Not be ruled out as fraud. | |
| "Ordinary_researchers" | ##10 | Nat Med | 2014 | 10.1038/nm.3432 | 2016-08-14 | letter to University of Tokyo | None | None | Not be ruled out as fraud. | |
| "Ordinary_researchers" | ##11 | Cell | 2015 | 10.1016/j.cell.2015.10.013 | 2016-08-14 | letter to University of Tokyo | None | None | Not be ruled out as fraud. | |
| "Ordinary_researchers" | ##12 | Nat Commun | 2016 | 10.1038/ncomms11635 | 2016-08-29 | letter to University of Tokyo | None | None | Not be ruled out as fraud. | |
| "Ordinary_researchers" | ##13 | Int Heart J | 2016 | 10.1536/ihj.15-332 | 2016-08-29 | letter to University of Tokyo | None | None | Not be ruled out as fraud. | |
| "Ordinary_researchers" | ##14 | Sci Rep | 2015 | 10.1038/srep14453 | 2016-08-29 | letter to University of Tokyo | None | None | Not be ruled out as fraud. | |
| "Ordinary_researchers" | ##15 | Sci Rep | 2016 | 10.1038/srep25009 | 2016-08-29 | letter to University of Tokyo | None | None | Not be ruled out as fraud. | |
| "Ordinary_researchers" | ##16 | Cell | 2005 | 10.1016/j.cell.2005.09.013 | 2016-08-29 | letter to University of Tokyo | None | None | Not be ruled out as fraud. | |
| "Ordinary_researchers" | ##17 | Nature | 2008 | 10.1038/nature07217 | 2016-08-29 | letter to University of Tokyo | None | Corrigendum | Fraud. | |
| "Ordinary_researchers" | ##18 | Science | 2010 | 10.1126/science.1194498 | 2016-08-29 | letter to University of Tokyo | None | Corrigendum | Fraud. | |
| "Ordinary_researchers" | ##19 | Nat Cell Biol | 2010 | 10.1038/ncb2052 | 2016-08-29 | letter to University of Tokyo | None | None | Not be ruled out as fraud. | |
| "Ordinary_researchers" | ##20 | Nature | 2011 | 10.1038/nature10179 | 2016-08-29 | letter to University of Tokyo | None | Corrigendum | Fraud. | |
| "Ordinary_researchers" | ##21 | EMBO Rep | 2011 | 10.1038/embor.2011.188 | 2016-08-29 | letter to University of Tokyo | None | Corrigendum | Fraud. | |
| "Ordinary_researchers" | ##22 | Science | 2015 | 10.1126/science.aaa2655 | 2016-08-29 | letter to University of Tokyo | None | Retracted | Fraud. | |

*"Officially unknown" means that it was reported in the mass media that it could not be ruled out as fraudulent, but the institute has not made an official announcement. "Completely innocent" means that the experimental notebooks was opened to the public and logical explanation was provided.

== See also ==
- Post-publication peer review
- PubPeer
- Elisabeth Bik

=== Other Japanese major scientific misconducts ===
- Japanese Paleolithic hoax
- Yoshitaka Fujii
- STAP cell
