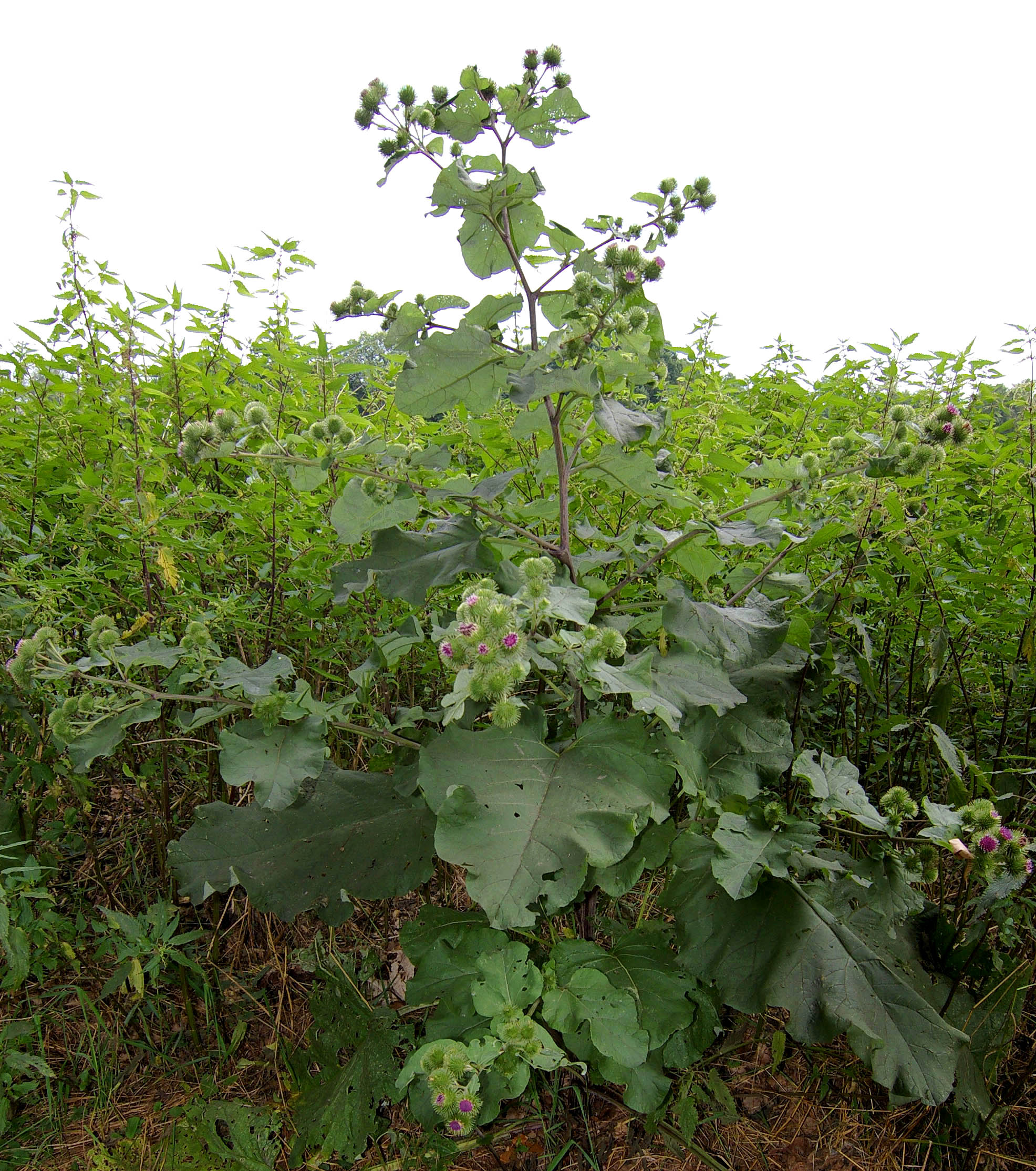
- Greater burdock

Scientific classification
- Kingdom: Plantae
- Clade: Tracheophytes
- Clade: Angiosperms
- Clade: Eudicots
- Clade: Asterids
- Order: Asterales
- Family: Asteraceae
- Genus: Arctium
- Species: A. lappa

Binomial name
- Arctium lappa L.

Synonyms
- Synonymy: Arcion majus Bubani; Arcion tomentosum Bubani; Arctium bardana Willd.; Arctium chaorum Klokov; Arctium grandiflorum Desf.; Arctium leiospermum Juz. & Ye.V.Serg.; Arctium majus (Gaertn.) Bernh.; Arctium ruderale Salisb.; Arctium vulgare (Hill) Evans; Arctium vulgare (Hill) Druce; Bardana arctium Hill; Bardana lappa Hill; Lappa glabra Lam.; Lappa major Gaertn.; Lappa nemorosa (Lej.) Körn. ex Griewank; Lappa officinalis All.; Lappa vulgaris Hill; Lappa platylepis Boiss. & Balansa ex Boiss. & Balansa

= Arctium lappa =

Species of flowering plant

Arctium lappa, commonly called greater burdock, gobō (牛蒡/ゴボウ), edible burdock, lappa, beggar's buttons, thorny burr, or happy major is a Eurasian species of plants in the family Asteraceae.

It has become an invasive weed of high-nitrogen soils in North America, Australia, and other regions, but is cultivated for its vegetable root.

== Description ==
Greater burdock is a biennial plant, rather tall, reaching as much as 3 metres (10 feet). The fleshy taproot can grow up to 1 m (3 1/2 ft) long and 2 centimetres (3/4 in) across. It has large, alternating, wavy-edged cordiform leaves that have a long petiole and are pubescent on the underside.

The flowers are purple and grouped in globular capitula, united in clusters. They appear in mid-summer, from July to September. The capitula are surrounded by an involucre made out of many bracts, each curving to form a hook, allowing the mature fruits to be carried long distances. The fruits are long, compressed achenes with short pappus hairs.

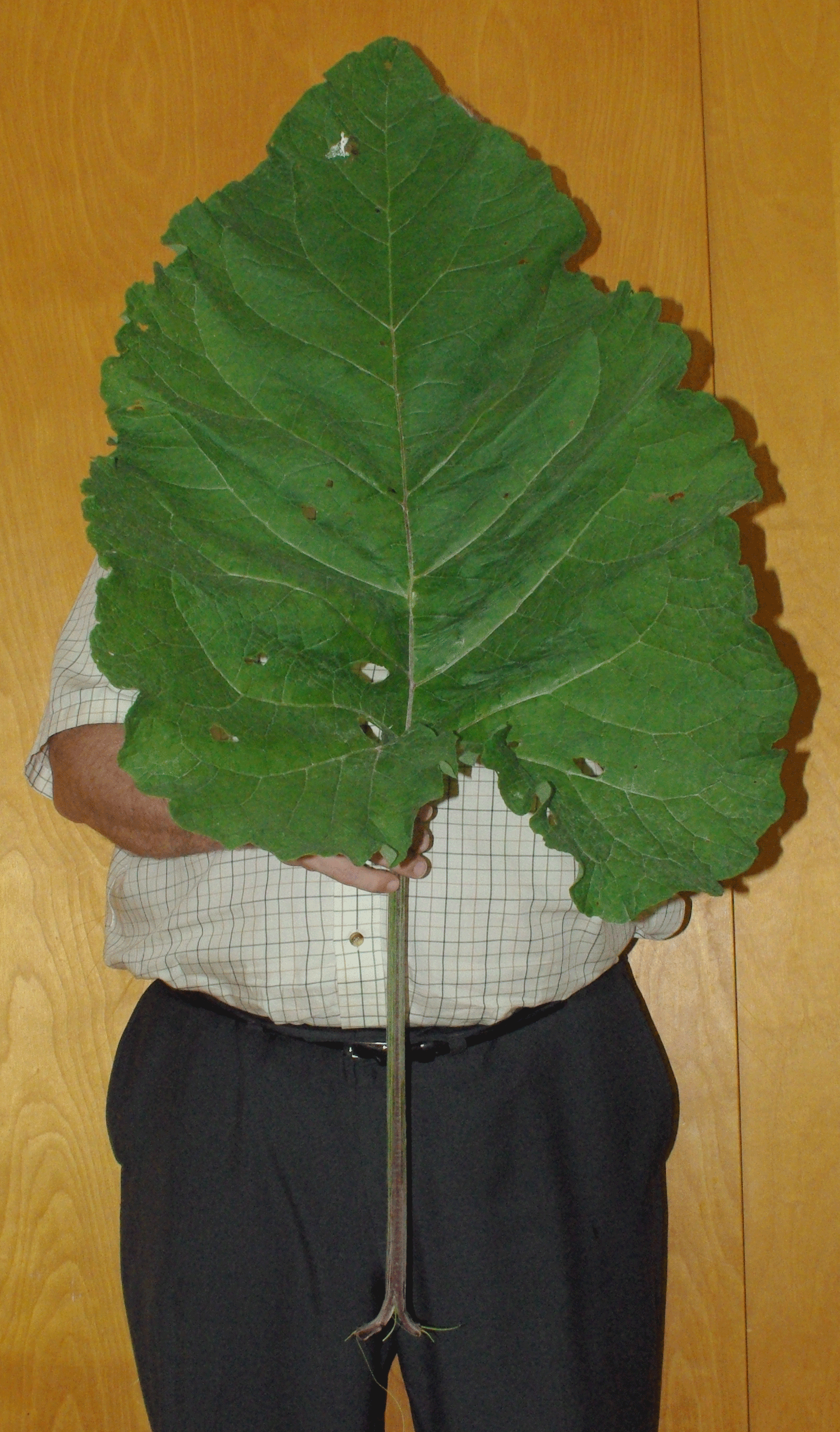
A 1.8 m (6 ft) man with leaf

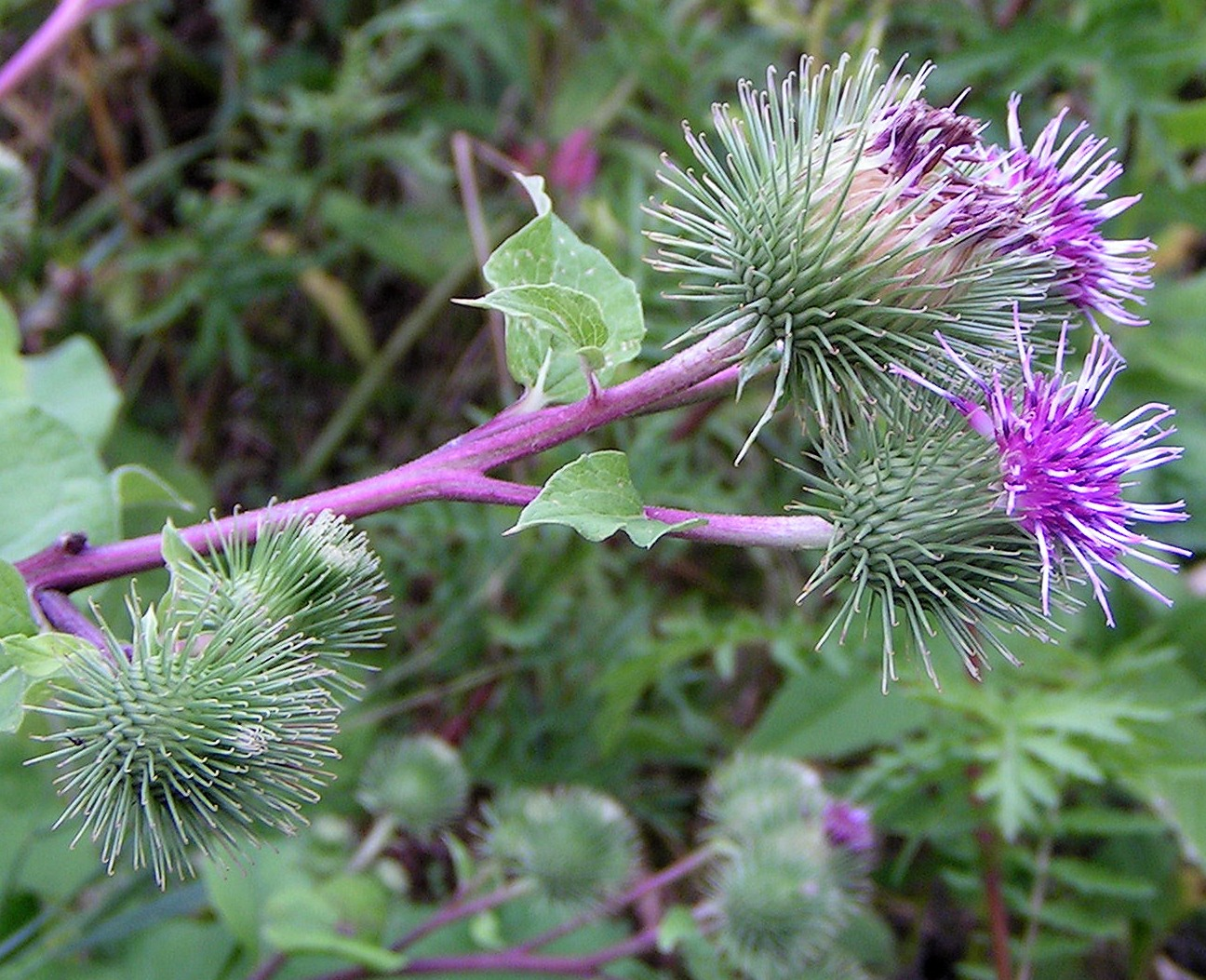
Inflorescence

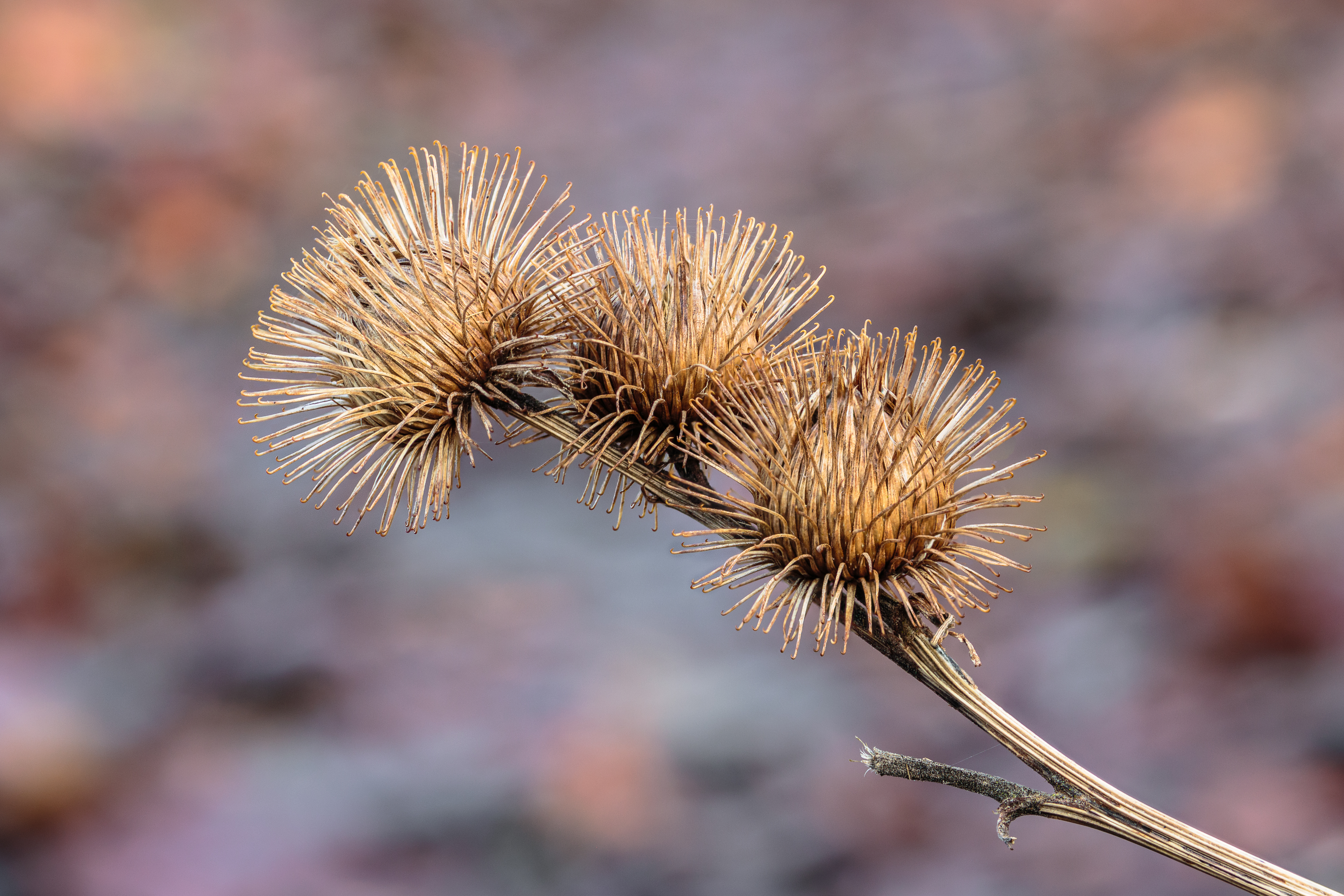
Mature fruit in nature

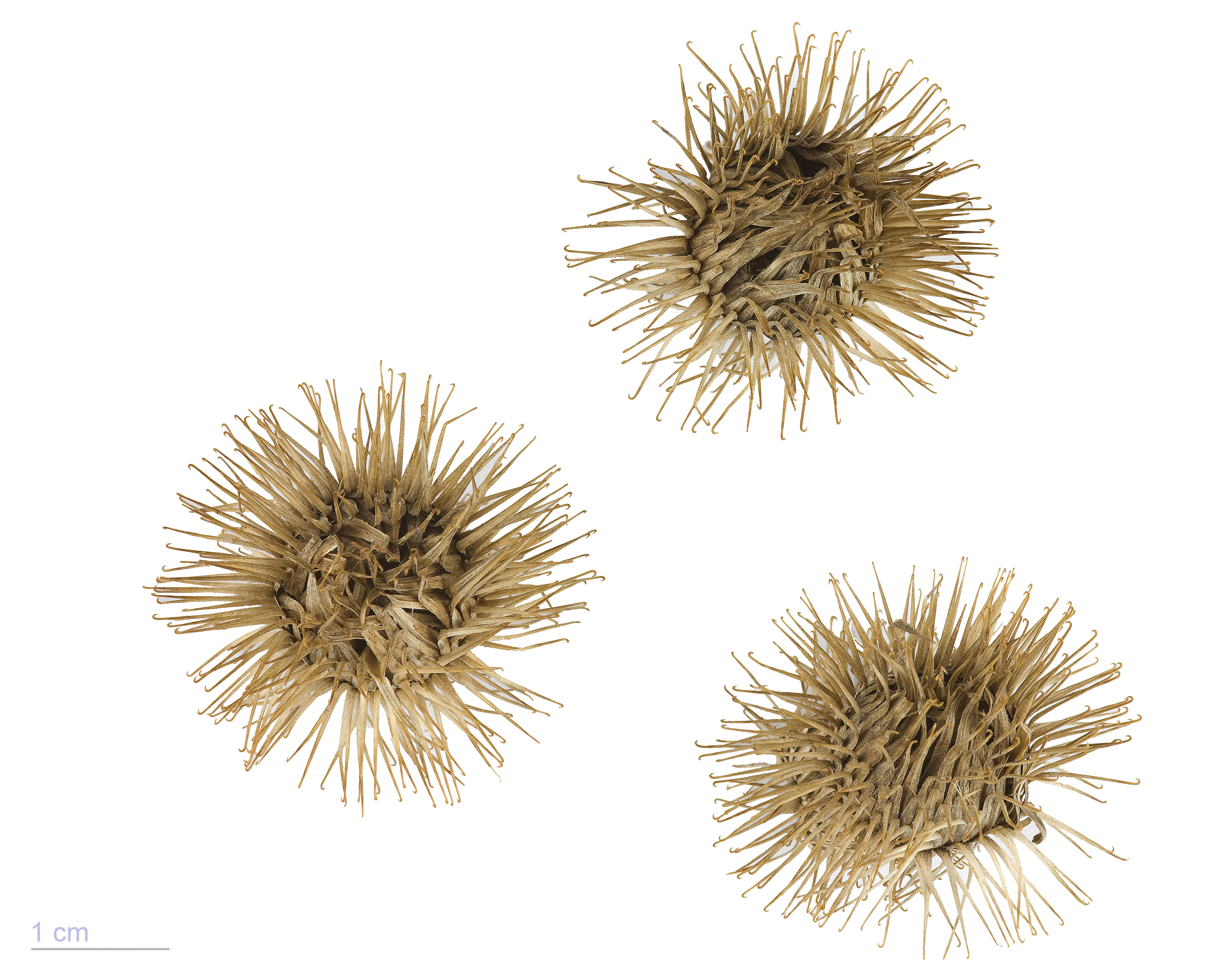
Burrs close-up

=== Chemistry ===
Burdock roots contain mucilage, sulfurous acetylene compounds, polyacetylenes and bitter guaianolide-type constituents. Seeds contain arctigenin, arctiin, and butyrolactone lignans.

=== Similar species ===
The burdock could be confused with rhubarb, the leaves of which are toxic.

== Taxonomy ==
Arctium lappa was named and described by the Swedish botanist Carl Linnaeus in 1753. Its type specimen was collected from a cultivated waste area in Europe ("habitat in Europae cultis ruderatis").

== Distribution and habitat ==
This species is native to the temperate regions of the Old World, from Scandinavia to the Mediterranean, and from the British Isles through Russia, and the Middle East to India, China, Taiwan and Japan.

It is naturalized widely in temperate climates and is usually found in disturbed areas, especially in soil rich in humus and nitrogen, preferring full sunlight.

== Ecology ==
The leaves of greater burdock provide food for the caterpillars of some Lepidoptera, such as the thistle ermine (Myelois circumvoluta).

=== As an invasive species ===
It has become an invasive weed of high-nitrogen soils in North America, Australia, and other regions.

== Health concerns ==
The burrs are a potential hazard for humans, horses, and dogs. The minute, sharply-pointed, bristly pappus hairs easily detach from the top of the achenes and are carried by the slightest breeze – attaching to skin, mucous membranes, and eyes where they can cause severe dermal irritation, possible respiratory manifestations, and ophthalmia.

== Uses ==
Burdock root, raw
Nutritional value per 100 g (3.5 oz)
- Energy: 72 kcal (300 kJ)
- Carbohydrates: 17.34 g
- Sugars: 2.9
- Dietary fiber: 3.3 g
- Fat: 0.15 g
- Protein: 1.53 g
Vitamins and minerals
Vitamins	Quantity %DV^{†}
Thiamine (B1)	1% 0.01 mg
Riboflavin (B2)	2% 0.03 mg
Niacin (B3)	2% 0.3 mg
Pantothenic acid (B5)	6% 0.321 mg
Vitamin B6	14% 0.24 mg
Folate (B9)	6% 23 μg
Vitamin C	3% 3 mg
Vitamin E	3% 0.38 mg
Vitamin K	1% 1.6 μg
Minerals	Quantity %DV^{†}
Calcium	3% 41 mg
Iron	4% 0.8 mg
Magnesium	9% 38 mg
Manganese	10% 0.232 mg
Phosphorus	4% 51 mg
Potassium	10% 308 mg
Sodium	0% 5 mg
Zinc	3% 0.33 mg
- Other constituents: Quantity
- Water: 80 g
- Link to USDA Database entry
- ^{†}Percentages estimated using US recommendations for adults, except for potassium, which is estimated based on expert recommendation from the National Academies.

=== Nutrition ===
Raw burdock root is 80% water, 17% carbohydrates, 2% protein, and contains negligible fat (table). In a reference amount of 100 g (3.5 oz), raw burdock root supplies 72 calories, and is a moderate source (10-14% of the Daily Value, DV) of vitamin B6, manganese, and potassium (table).

=== Culinary ===
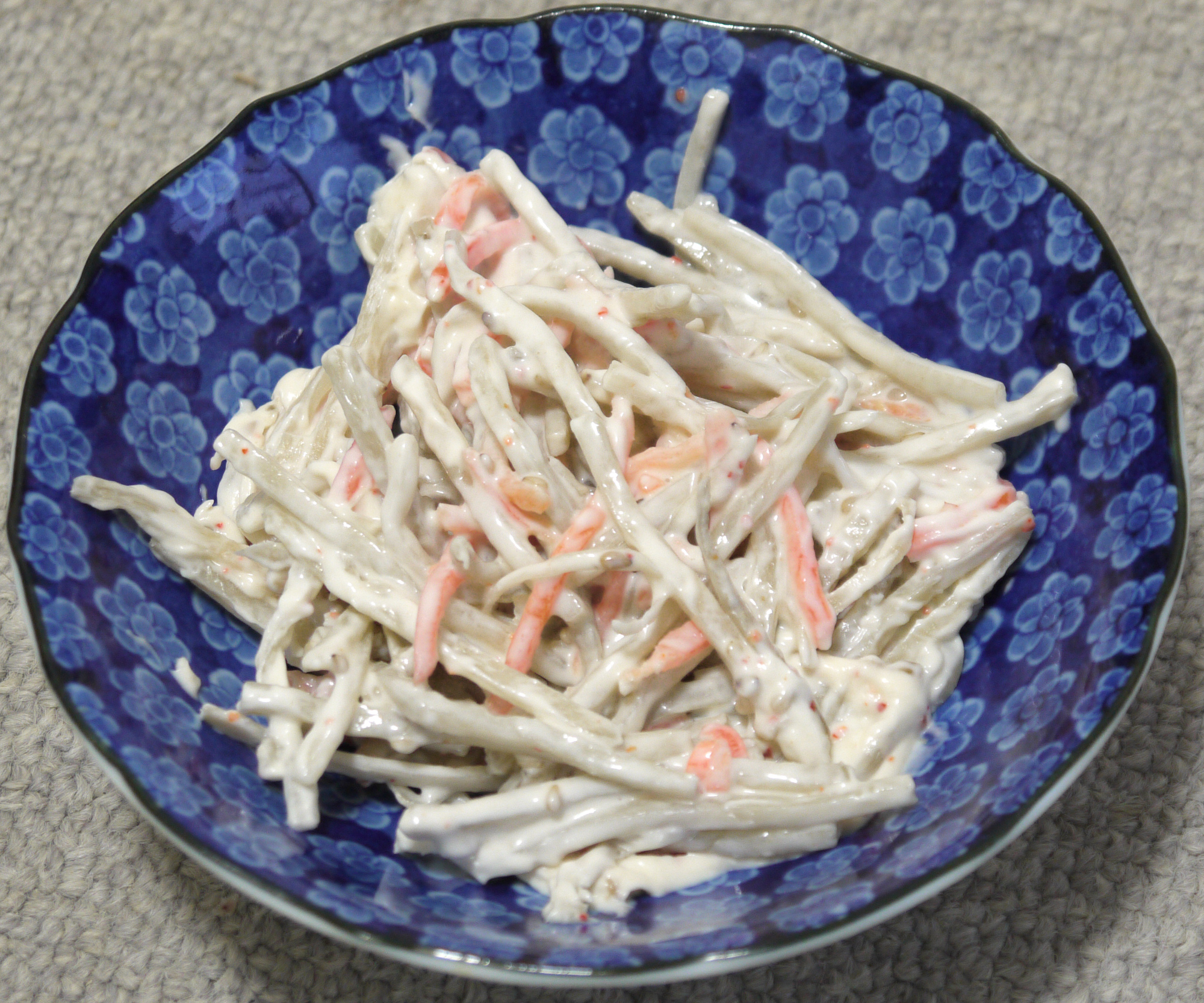
Japanese gobō salad

The tender leaf stalks can be peeled and eaten raw or cooked, with the taste resembling that of artichoke, a burdock relative. The roots can be roasted or julienned and braised in soy sauce for use in stir fries and soups. The root is crisp and has a sweet, mild, and pungent flavor with a little muddy harshness that can be reduced by soaking julienned/shredded roots in water for five to ten minutes.

A Japanese dish is kinpira gobō, julienned or shredded burdock root and carrot, braised with soy sauce, sugar, mirin and/or sake, and sesame oil. Fermentation of the root by Aspergillus oryzae is also used for making miso and rice wine in Japanese cuisine.

In the second half of the 20th century, burdock was noted for its culinary use due to the increasing use of the macrobiotic diet, which advocates its consumption. The root contains a fair amount of dietary fiber and polyphenols that cause the darkened surface and muddy harshness by formation of tannin-iron complexes.

Greater burdock root was used in Europe during the Middle Ages as a vegetable, but is rarely used in modern times except in Italy and Portugal, where it is known as bardana or "garduna". The root was traditionally used in Britain as a flavouring in the herbal drink dandelion and burdock, which is still commercially produced.

=== Traditional medicine ===
Dried burdock roots (Bardanae radix) are used in traditional medicine. The seeds of greater burdock are employed in traditional Chinese medicine under the name niubangzi (Chinese: 牛蒡子; pinyin: niúbàngzǐ).

== Bibliography ==
- Linnaeus, Carl (1753). Species Plantarum: exhibentes plantas rite cognitas, ad genera relatas, cum differentiis specificis, nominibus trivialibus, synonymis selectis, locis natalibus, secundum systema sexuale digestas (1st ed.). Stockholm: Impensis Laurentii Salvii.
