= Arctiin =

Names
- IUPAC name (3R,4R)-4-[(3,4-dimethoxyphenyl)methyl]-3-{[3-methoxy-4-[(2S,3R,4S,5S,6R)-3,4,5-trihydroxy-6-(hydroxymethyl)oxan-2-yl]oxyphenyl]methyl}oxolan-2-one

Identifiers
CAS Number	20362-31-6
3D model (JSmol)	Interactive image
ChEMBL	ChEMBL388452
ChemSpider	90827
KEGG	C16915
MeSH	arctigenin
PubChem CID	100528
UNII	TM5RQ949K7
CompTox Dashboard (EPA)	DTXSID20942519
- InChI: InChI=1S/C27H34O11/c1-33-18-6-4-14(10-20(18)34-2)8-16-13-36-26(32)17(16)9-15-5-7-19(21(11-15)35-3)37-27-25(31)24(30)23(29)22(12-28)38-27/h4-7,10-11,16-17,22-25,27-31H,8-9,12-13H2,1-3H3/t16-,17+,22+,23+,24-,25+,27+/m0/s1 Key: XOJVHLIYNSOZOO-SWOBOCGESA-N; InChI=1/C27H34O11/c1-33-18-6-4-14(10-20(18)34-2)8-16-13-36-26(32)17(16)9-15-5-7-19(21(11-15)35-3)37-27-25(31)24(30)23(29)22(12-28)38-27/h4-7,10-11,16-17,22-25,27-31H,8-9,12-13H2,1-3H3/t16-,17+,22+,23+,24-,25+,27+/m0/s1 Key: XOJVHLIYNSOZOO-SWOBOCGEBY
- SMILES: O=C2OC[C@H](Cc1ccc(OC)c(OC)c1)[C@H]2Cc4ccc(O[C@@H]3O[C@@H]([C@@H](O)[C@H](O)[C@H]3O)CO)c(OC)c4

Properties
Chemical formula	C_{27}H_{34}O_{11}
Molar mass	534.558 g·mol^{−1}
Melting point	110 to 112 °C (230 to 234 °F; 383 to 385 K)
- Except where otherwise noted, data are given for materials in their standard state (at 25 °C [77 °F], 100 kPa). verify (what is ?) Infobox references

Arctiin is a lignan found in many plants of the family Asteraceae, particularly the greater burdock (Arctium lappa) and Centaurea imperialis, and in Trachelospermum asiaticum, Saussurea heteromalla, and Forsythia viridissima. It is the glucoside of arctigenin.

Arctiin and arctigenin have been found to act as agonists of the adiponectin receptor 1.
