= Deoxyschizandrin =

Names
- Preferred IUPAC name (6R,7S)-1,2,3,10,11,12-Hexamethoxy-6,7-dimethyl-5,6,7,8-tetrahydrodibenzo[a,c][8]annulene
- Other names Schizandrin A; Schisandrin A; Dimethylgomisin J

Identifiers
CAS Number	61281-38-7
3D model (JSmol)	Interactive image
ChEBI	CHEBI:80818
ChEMBL	ChEMBL479898
ChemSpider	136769
KEGG	C16951
PubChem CID	43595
UNII	74XQL5DO3S
CompTox Dashboard (EPA)	DTXSID10219222
- InChI: InChI=1S/C24H32O6/c1-13-9-15-11-17(25-3)21(27-5)23(29-7)19(15)20-16(10-14(13)2)12-18(26-4)22(28-6)24(20)30-8/h11-14H,9-10H2,1-8H3/t13-,14+ Key: JEJFTTRHGBKKEI-OKILXGFUSA-N
- SMILES: C[C@@H]1CC2=CC(=C(C(=C2C3=C(C(=C(C=C3C[C@@H]1C)OC)OC)OC)OC)OC)OC

Properties
Chemical formula	C_{24}H_{32}O_{6}
Molar mass	416.514 g·mol^{−1}
- Except where otherwise noted, data are given for materials in their standard state (at 25 °C [77 °F], 100 kPa). Infobox references

Deoxyschizandrin is a bio-active isolate of Schisandra chinensis.

Deoxyschizandrin has been found to act as an agonist of the adiponectin receptor 2 (AdipoR2).
