= Dana–Farber Cancer Institute =

Cancer treatment and research institution in Boston, US

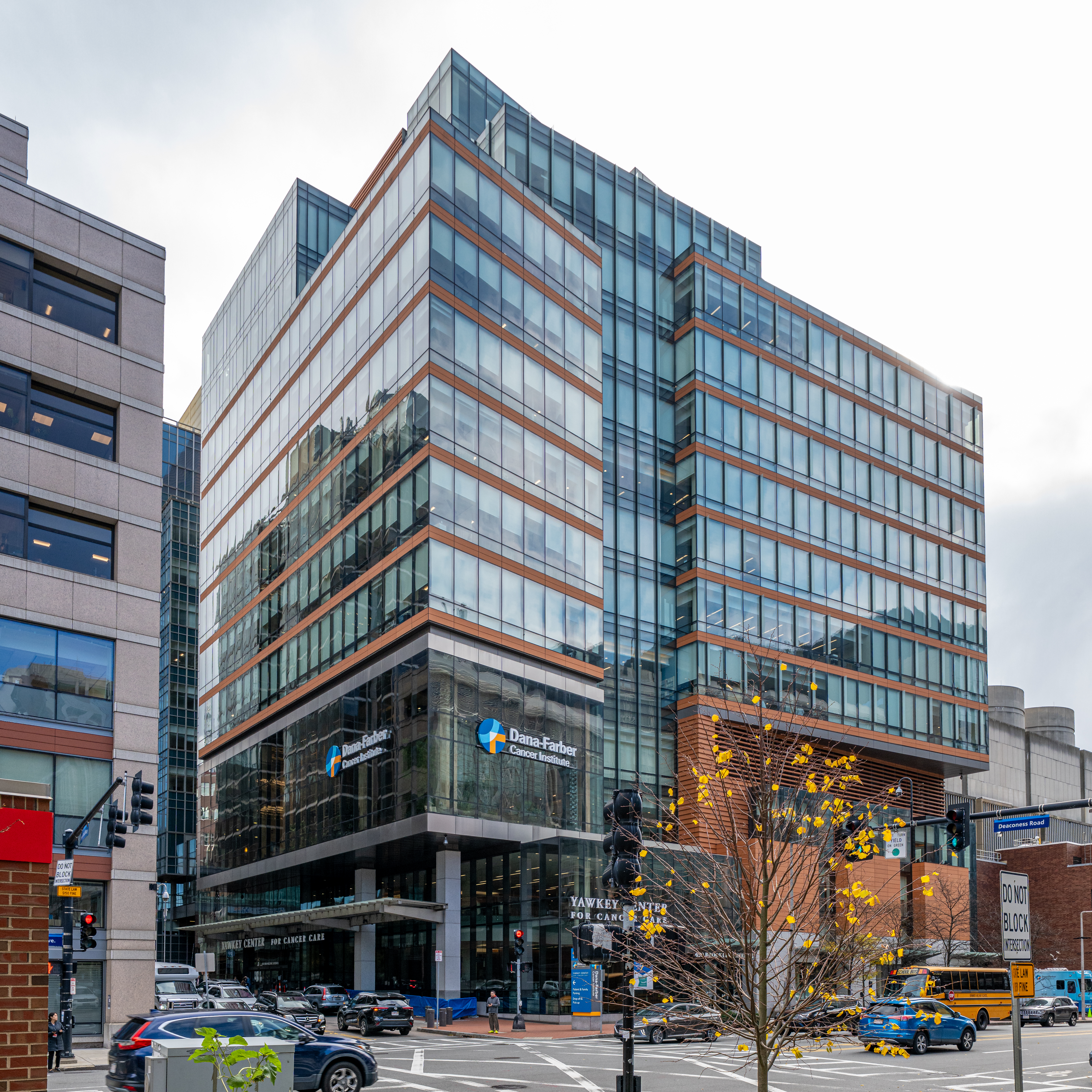
- Yawkey Center for Cancer Care (2025)

Geography
- Location: 450 Brookline Avenue, Boston, Massachusetts, United States
- Coordinates: 42°20′16″N 71°6′27″W

Organization
- Care system: Private
- Type: Specialist
- Affiliated university: Harvard University

Services
- Standards: NCI-designated Cancer Center
- Speciality: Oncology, Teaching hospital

Helipads
- Helipad: Yes

History
- Founded: 1947: Bus 8, 19, 47, 60, 65, CT2, CT3; Green Line D, E

Links
- Website: www.dana-farber.org
- Lists: Hospitals in Massachusetts

Dana–Farber Cancer Institute (DFCI) is a comprehensive cancer treatment and research center in Boston, Massachusetts. Dana–Farber is the founding member of the Dana–Farber/Harvard Cancer Center, Harvard's Comprehensive Cancer Center designated by the National Cancer Institute, and is a principal teaching affiliate and research institute of Harvard Medical School.

As of 2024, Dana–Farber is ranked as the sixth-best cancer hospital in the US. Two Nobel laureates in Physiology or Medicine are among its past and present faculty.

In 2024, an investigation revealed evidence of research misconduct in dozens of studies authored by Dana–Farber researchers, including then-president and chief executive officer Laurie Glimcher, the executive vice president and chief operating officer, and the research integrity officer. In response to these findings, Dana–Farber retracted seven papers and corrected 31 others. In October 2024, Laurie Glimcher stepped down as president and CEO. In December 2025, Dana Farber agreed to pay $15 million to settle the fraud allegations, including over $2.5 million to scientist Sholto David.

== Overview ==
Dana–Farber in 2024 employed more than 8,046 full-time and part-time workers and 558 faculty and had an annual gross revenue of about $3.4 billion. All faculty and postdoctoral research fellows at Dana–Farber hold the equivalent academic positions concurrently at Harvard University. More than 628,000 adult and pediatric patient visits (combined exam and office visits) occur each year, and it is involved in more than 1,100 clinical trials. It is internationally known for its research and clinical excellence. Expertscape ranks its programs in aplastic anemia and multiple myeloma as best in the world. It has been also ranked overall the third-best cancer hospital in the United States by U.S. News & World Report. Dana–Farber is a member of the Multiple Myeloma Research Consortium.

In addition to being a principal teaching affiliate of Harvard Medical School, Dana–Farber is also a federally designated center for AIDS research, and is a founding member of the Dana–Farber/Harvard Cancer Center, a research consortium that is one of the 39 federally designated comprehensive cancer centers. Providing advanced training in cancer treatment and research for an international faculty, Dana–Farber conducts community-based programs in cancer prevention, detection, and control in New England, and maintains joint programs with other Boston institutions, including St. Elizabeth's Medical Center, Brigham and Women's Hospital, Boston Children's Hospital, and Massachusetts General Hospital.

In September 2023, Dana–Farber announced it was forming a new collaboration with Beth Israel Deaconess Medical Center and would partner to build dedicated adult cancer hospital adjacent to their existing campuses in the Longwood Medical Area of Boston.

Dana–Farber is supported by the National Cancer Institute, the National Institute of Allergy and Infectious Diseases, and private foundations and individuals contributions. The Jimmy Fund is the principal charity of the institute, named for one of its child patients. The Boston Red Sox adopted the Jimmy Fund as its official charity in 1953 and continues to prominently sponsor the charity.

Benjamin L. Ebert is president/CEO of Dana–Farber Cancer Institute. In 2015, Forbes listed the charity as the 37th-biggest in the U.S.

== History ==
In 1947, pediatric pathologist Sidney Farber founded the Children's Cancer Research Foundation (CCRF) with Variety Club to raise money for cancer research. The foundation launched the Jimmy Fund the following year with an advertising campaign featuring a child nicknamed "Jimmy", and constructed the Jimmy Fund Building in the Longwood Medical Area in 1952 to house research facilities. In 1969, the foundation expanded its programs to include patients of all ages, and in 1974 was renamed the Sidney Farber Cancer Center.

In 1962, philanthropist Charles A. Dana, through the Dana Foundation, began financial support of the CCRF. The Dana Building was opened near the Jimmy Fund building in 1975, and in 1983, the organization's name was changed to Dana–Farber Cancer Institute in recognition of the foundation's support.

In 1997, the Smith Research Laboratories building was opened across the street from the Dana Building and the inpatient hospital was moved to Brigham and Women's Hospital, freeing up space for research, laboratories, and adult outpatient care. The Yawkey Center for Cancer Care was opened adjacent to the Smith Laboratories in 2011 to provide additional outpatient facilities.

In September 2023, Dana–Farber Cancer Institute announced a new partnership with Beth Israel Deaconess Medical Center and plans to build a new standalone inpatient hospital focused on treating adult cancer patients. This includes a departure from their current home and longtime affiliation with Brigham and Women's Hospital, which had been recognized among U.S. News & World Report's top cancer care facilities for 23 consecutive years.

== Breakthroughs ==
Dana–Farber has a long history of breakthrough discoveries in cancer care and research.

- 1947: Sidney Farber leads a team of researchers who are the first in the world to attain temporary remissions of acute lymphocytic leukemia, the most common cancer in children, using aminopterin. This, and another antifolate drug, methotrexate used by Dr. Farber, were discovered and supplied by Dr. Yellapragada Subba Rao, Director, Research at Lederle Co. at Pearl River, NY.
- 1954: Farber and his colleagues achieve the first remissions of Wilms' tumor, a common form of childhood cancer, and boost cure rates from 40 percent to 85 percent.
- 1976: Researchers at the Sidney Farber Cancer Center (now Dana–Farber) develop a new treatment for acute myelogenous leukemia that produces the first complete remissions of the disease in up to half of all patients.
- 1978: Institute investigators develop combination chemotherapy for soft-tissue sarcomas resulting in a 50-percent response rate.
- 1980: Dana–Farber president Baruj Benacerraf receives the Nobel Prize in Physiology or Medicine for the discovery of the major histocompatibility complex, which enables the immune system to recognize antigens.
- 1982: Dana–Farber researchers develop and apply the CA-125 blood test for ovarian cancer. They also are among the first to suspect a relationship between the retrovirus that causes human T-cell leukemia (HTLV-1) and that which causes AIDS (HIV-1).
- 1991: Dana–Farber investigators help introduce the use of naturally occurring growth hormones following high-dose chemotherapy, making bone marrow transplantation safer and more effective.
- 1993: Dana–Farber investigators discover the gene that increases the risk for a common type of colon cancer. The MSH2 gene and later the MLH1 gene (also by DFCI investigators) are linked to hereditary nonpolyposis colorectal cancer (HNPCC).
- 1996: Institute researchers dramatically advance the understanding of how HIV, the virus that causes AIDS, replicates and infects healthy cells. Science magazine heralds this discovery as its "Breakthrough of the Year".
- 1998: A drug called imatinib (Gleevec), the early work for which was done at Dana–Farber, achieves striking success in many patients with chronic myelogenous leukemia.
- 1999: Working with colleagues at other hospitals, Dana–Farber scientists begin the first human studies of endostatin, one of a new generation of compounds that arrest or shrink tumors by shutting off their blood supply.
- 2002: Dana–Farber researchers find that Gleevec, a targeted therapy that achieved striking success against chronic myelogenous leukemia, can shrink and even eliminate tumors in some patients with a rare and otherwise incurable digestive-tract cancer called gastrointestinal stromal tumor.
- 2003: Scientists at Dana–Farber and the Whitehead Institute find a gene "signature" in several types of tumors that suggests they are likely to spread to other parts of the body, potentially leading to tests for determining whether tumors have the potential to metastasize.
- 2005: Dana–Farber scientists report that the drug gefitinib (Iressa) produces dramatic benefits in non-small cell lung cancer patients who carry an abnormal version of a key protein, a potentially life-saving discovery for tens of thousands of patients around the world every year.
- 2019: Dana–Farber physician and researcher William Kaelin Jr. receives the Nobel Prize in Physiology or Medicine for "discoveries of how cells sense and adapt to oxygen availability."
- 2025: Dana-Farber scientists work with researchers from University of Toronto, Insilico Medicine, Stanford University, Zapata Quantum and others to use hybrid quantum-classical methods to improve the quality and success rate of discovering experimentally validated candidate KRAS inhibitors for cancer therapy.

== Academic integrity issues ==
In 2024, an investigation revealed evidence of research misconduct in dozens of studies authored by Dana–Farber researchers. Notable Dana–Farber employees tied to the misconduct allegations included then President and CEO Laurie Glimcher, the Executive Vice President and COO William C. Hahn, and the Research Integrity Officer Barrett Rollins.

The misconduct involved image discrepancies, including duplications of blots, bands, and plots. A review of the allegations was complicated by the authors' inability to provide the original data from older papers, citing lab storage limitations. Elisabeth Bik, a recognized expert in image manipulation who examined some of the images, refrained from speculating on whether the manipulation was intentional. However, she noted that a large volume of data issues in a scholar's work can be "very suggestive of an intention to mislead."

Not all of the studies reported on required a correction or retraction. The institute noted that, “The presence of image discrepancies in a paper is not evidence of an author's intent to deceive. That conclusion can only be drawn after a careful, fact-based examination which is an integral part of our response. Our experience is that errors are often unintentional and do not rise to the level of misconduct.” The corrections and retractions were part of a larger trend and use of AI in identifying image discrepancies and other issues from researchers, universities and research institutions around the world.

More than 51 studies, many of them decades old, were affected. Dana–Farber's Office of Research Integrity immediately began a review of the papers and when needed, submitted corrections and retractions to the medical journals. In total, 7 papers were retracted and 31 others were corrected, and, in October 2024, Laurie Glimcher stepped down as president and CEO.

== Patient care ==
Dana–Farber/St. Elizabeth's Cancer Center (DF/SEMC) and Dana–Farber/Brigham and Women's Cancer Center (DF/BWCC) are collaborations between Dana–Farber Cancer Institute, St. Elizabeth's Medical Center, and Brigham and Women's Hospital to care for adults with cancer. Dana–Farber provides outpatient services, while inpatient care is provided by St. Elizabeth's Medical Center and Brigham and Women's Hospital. DF/SEMC and DF/BWCC care for adult patients in more than a dozen specialized treatment centers.

Dana–Farber/Boston Children's Cancer and Blood Disorders Center is a more than 70-year-old partnership between Boston Children's Hospital and Dana–Farber Cancer Institute that delivers comprehensive care to children with and survivors of all types of childhood cancers.

They also work with several other local New England organizations that share a similar vision, such as Take a Swing at Cancer, Angel's Hope, Childhood Cancer Lifeline of New Hampshire and Andrew's Helpful Hands.

== Dana–Farber/Harvard Cancer Center ==
The Dana–Farber/Harvard Cancer Center is the largest National Cancer Institute (NCI) designated Comprehensive Cancer Center in the nation. Founded in 1997, DF/HCC is an inter-institutional research enterprise that unites all of the cancer research efforts of the Harvard affiliated community. The primary goal of the Cancer Center is to encourage and promote collaborative interactions and translational research that will lead to new approaches to cancer prevention, diagnosis, and treatment.

DF/HCC is one of just 39 NCI designated Comprehensive Cancer Centers. Its members hail from the following institutions: Beth Israel Deaconess Medical Center, Brigham and Women’s Hospital, Boston Children's Hospital, Dana–Farber Cancer Institute, Harvard Medical School, Harvard School of Public Health, Massachusetts General Hospital, and St. Elizabeth's Medical Center.
