= Take a Swing at Cancer =

American non-profit organization

- Established: 1998
- Founders: Kristen Dion, Ron Dyer, Russ Fustino, Jan Jenkins, Courtney 'Chip' Lloyd, Melvin Marcus, James Ragazzo, Andrew Smyth, Donald Voner
- Headquarters: Framingham, Massachusetts, US
- Members: N/A
- President: Kristen Dion
- Website: www.takeaswing.org

Take A Swing at Cancer, Inc. (TASC) is an American tax-exempt charity (IRS designated 501(c)(3)) that was established in memory of cancer patients and raises money to be used in the war against cancer. The emphasis of their fundraising events centers on (but is not limited to) sporting activities. Funds raised are primarily given directly to individuals in need. But, the organization's charter also allows them to contribute to tax-exempt charities and organizations that provide cancer services such as research, treatment, early detection, family support, hospice and education. The organization is headquartered in Framingham, Massachusetts, operates in and around the New England region of the United States and works primarily with beneficiaries from the same area.

== Mission ==
Take a Swing at Cancer's mission is to help families affected by cancer. The goal is to ease the financial burden placed on families by offering alternative funding to assist with the expenses not covered by traditional insurance.

== Organization ==
Take a Swing at Cancer - Official By-laws, 2006 Revision

Take a Swing at Cancer - Articles of Organization, Commonwealth of Massachusetts

TASC is governed by a 15-member all-volunteer board of directors. Each year, half of the directors are elected to two-year terms. A president, vice-president, treasurer and secretary are all elected annually by the board. The president runs the day-to-day operations of the organization and the fiscal year runs January through December.

There are several committee structures throughout the organization. Many of these center around TASC's various fundraising events (softball, golf, etc.). But, there is also a Marketing, Beneficiary, Finance and Website Committee. Committee chairs are appointed by the president at the beginning of the year. Meetings are typically held once a month, although there is also an annual meeting that takes place at the end of the calendar year. All board members and committee chairs congregate to organize future events, discuss internal business and promote the general growth of the organization. While board members are the only ones who can vote on general matters of business, volunteers and the general public are encouraged to attend and participate.

== History ==
Take a Swing at Cancer - 501(c)(3) IRS Designation Letter

The organization's roots began in 1991 when a small group of volunteers, known informally as the Softball Against Cancer Committee, came together to run a charity softball event.

In the early months of 1998, after several years of successful tournaments, committee members joined forces to incorporate Take a Swing at Cancer, Inc. (TASC) into its own non-profit organization, complete with a board of directors and slate of officers. Incorporating allowed TASC to broaden its beneficiary reach and have a more direct impact on those facing the challenges of battling cancer.

In 2003, TASC gained 501(c)(3) status from the IRS.

== Softball ==
In 1991, Andy Smyth, along with brother, Jeff, and family friend, Don Voner, created the softball tournament and called it the "Betty Smyth Softball Classic". It was organized to commemorate the life and vivacity of Andy and Jeff’s mother, who died of breast cancer in 1988. The idea for the event was to have a weekend filled with fun centered around softball, while contributing to the fight against cancer. The event continued in 1992 and 1993, growing more successful with each passing year.

In 1996, the tournament was re-created as "Take a Swing at Cancer '96" and was even more successful than the previous tournaments. Twenty teams registered and over $6,000 was netted. All proceeds were donated directly to the American Cancer Society. By this time, a core group of committed volunteers had formed.

The first tournament was held at Tufts University in Medford, Massachusetts. All subsequent events have taken place at the MITRE Field Complex in Burlington, Massachusetts. The 2007 tournament represented the 15th Annual softball tournament and Hurricane Hanna forced the cancellation of the 16th Annual event in 2008.

== Golf ==
In the fall of 1999, TASC became involved with the Jared Tuccolo Memorial Golf Tournament by providing volunteers for the event and contributing $1,000. In 2000, TASC brought this event under its umbrella and became more involved in the planning process. The golf tournament has seen increasing profits in each successive year. The proceeds are disbursed in the form of scholarships to students at Jared's high school alma mater (Whittier Regional Vocational Technical High School in Haverhill, Massachusetts) with the remaining funds being distributed by the Beneficiary Committee to other cancer patients in need.

== Other events ==
Take a Swing at Cancer has participated in the Simon Mall Evening of Giving since its inception. As of 2009, they began ramping up their 3rd annual Poker Tournament and they continue to solicit new ideas as the organization continues to grow.

== Beneficiary disbursements ==
Since 2000, more than $250,000 has been provided directly to beneficiaries of TASC. TASC disburses nearly 100% of its proceeds to worthy individuals and organizations who have completed the application process, which includes screening by the Beneficiary Committee. The beneficiary process often puts the Beneficiary Committee into direct contact with beneficiary recipients through the work of beneficiary liaisons. Many of TASC’s beneficiaries are individuals and families who need relief from the stress of mounting bills incurred during cancer treatment. Liaisons are in the unique position to assist people with expenses that are not covered by traditional insurance, including but not limited to mortgage payments, car repairs, and other household bills. They have also supported several organizations that share a similar vision, such as Andrew's Helpful Hands, Angel's Hope, Childhood Cancer Lifeline of New Hampshire and Dana Farber Cancer Institute.

== Logo ==
The original TASC logo was a three-person pyramid designed by Jennifer Smyth in the mid-1990s. The current TASC logo was designed in 2002 by Andee Wilcott. The concept of the 'running T' was designed to capture the ideas of motion, energy and compassion while simultaneously displaying an orientation towards sports that was not specific to any one sport.

== Presidents ==
- Russ Fustino – 1998–2000
- Donald Voner – 2000–2003
- Christine Nevosh – 2003–2005
- Danny Blood – 2005–Present
