= Sholto David =

British molecular biologist

Sholto David is a British molecular biologist and blogger. He is known for identifying flaws in scientific papers.

He graduated from Newcastle University in 2019 with a PhD in cellular and molecular biology. As of October 2024, he has posted entries on over 2,000 flawed scientific studies. Sholto has over 8,000 comments on PubPeer regarding irregularities he discovered in the medical literature as of August 2026.

On 2 January 2024 David made a blog post focused on image irregularities, with 30 papers published by scientists from the Dana–Farber Cancer Institute, including some by CEO Laurie Glimcher and COO William Hahn. In December 2025, the United States Department of Justice announced that Dana–Farber agreed to pay $15 million to resolve allegations that, between 2014 and 2024, it violated the version of the False Claims Act then in force. As whistleblower, Sholto received 17.5% of the qui tam settlement, $2.6 million.
