= Adiponectin receptor 2 =

Protein-coding gene in humans

ADIPOR2

Identifiers
- Aliases: ADIPOR2, adiponectin receptor 2, ACDCR2, PAQR2
- External IDs: OMIM: 607946; MGI: 93830; GeneCards: ADIPOR2
Available structures
PDB	Ortholog search: PDBe RCSB
PDB	List of PDB id codes 3WXW

Gene location (Human)
Chr.	Chromosome 12 (human)
Band	12p13.33	Start	1,688,574 bp
Band	12p13.33	End	1,788,674 bp

Gene location (Mouse)
Chr.	Chromosome 6 (mouse)
Band	6 F1|6 56.78 cM	Start	119,330,111 bp
Band	6 F1|6 56.78 cM	End	119,394,665 bp
RNA expression pattern
Bgee	Human / Mouse (ortholog); Top expressed in: corpus callosum; C1 segment; right adrenal cortex; right lung; left adrenal gland; left adrenal cortex; substantia nigra; liver; epithelium of colon; hippocampus proper / Top expressed in: lactiferous gland; brown adipose tissue; transitional epithelium of urinary bladder; vestibular membrane of cochlear duct; epithelium of small intestine; epithelium of stomach; pyloric antrum; left lobe of liver; white adipose tissue; tunica adventitia of aorta; More reference expression data
BioGPS	n/a
Gene ontology
Molecular function	adipokinetic hormone receptor activity; adiponectin binding; metal ion binding; identical protein binding; protein heterodimerization activity; signaling receptor activity
Cellular component	integral component of membrane; membrane; intrinsic component of plasma membrane; plasma membrane
Biological process	positive regulation of glucose import; glucose homeostasis; response to nutrient; lipid metabolism; female pregnancy; adiponectin-activated signaling pathway; fatty acid metabolic process; vascular wound healing; development of the heart; negative regulation of cell growth; fatty acid oxidation; hormone-mediated signaling pathway; regulation of fatty acid biosynthetic process; positive regulation of cold-induced thermogenesis
Sources:Amigo / QuickGO
Orthologs
Databases	NCBI: entry; OMA: entry
Species	Human	Mouse
Entrez	79602	68465
Ensembl	ENSG00000006831; ENSG00000285070	ENSMUSG00000030168
UniProt	Q86V24	Q8BQS5
RefSeq (mRNA)	NM_024551; NM_001375363; NM_001375364; NM_001375365	NM_197985; NM_001355692
RefSeq (protein)	NP_078827; NP_001362292; NP_001362293; NP_001362294	NP_932102; NP_001342621
Location (UCSC)	Chr 12: 1.69 – 1.79 Mb	Chr 6: 119.33 – 119.39 Mb
PubMed search
- Wikidata
View/Edit Human	View/Edit Mouse

Adiponectin receptor 2 (AdipoR2) is a protein which in humans is encoded by the ADIPOR2 gene. It is a member of the progestin and adipoQ receptor (PAQR) family, and is also known as PAQR2.

== Structure ==
Similar to G protein-coupled receptors (GPCRs), AdipoR2 also possesses 7 transmembrane domains. However, AdipoR2 is orientated oppositely to GPCRs in the membrane (i.e., cytoplasmic N-terminus, extracellular C-terminus) and does not associate with G proteins.

== Function ==
The adiponectin receptors, AdipoR1 and AdipoR2, serve as receptors for globular and full-length adiponectin and mediate increased AMPK and PPAR-α ligand activities, as well as fatty acid oxidation and glucose uptake by adiponectin. In 2016, the University of Tokyo announced that it would launch an investigation into claims of fabrication of AdipoR1 and AdipoR2 identification data, as accused by an anonymous person/group called Ordinary_researchers.

== Ligands ==
=== Agonists ===
==== Peptide ====
- Adiponectin
- ADP-355
- ADP-399

==== Non-peptide ====
- AdipoRon
- Deoxyschizandrin
- Parthenolide
- Syringing
- Taxifoliol
- Deoxyschizandrin

=== Antagonists ===
==== Peptide ====
- ADP-400

== See also ==
- Adiponectin receptor
- Adiponectin receptor 1
