= Adiponectin receptor =

Cell surface receptors for adiponectin

The adiponectin receptors (AdipoRs) include the following two receptors, which are bound and activated by adiponectin:

- Adiponectin receptor 1 (AdipoR1, PAQR1)
- Adiponectin receptor 2 (AdipoR2, PAQR2)

They are members of the progestin and adipoQ receptor (PAQR) family.

In 2016, the University of Tokyo announced that it would launch an investigation into claims of fabrication of AdipoR1 and AdipoR2 identification data, as accused by an anonymous person/group called Ordinary_researchers.
