= Adiponectin receptor 1 =

Protein found in humans

ADIPOR1

Identifiers
- Aliases: ADIPOR1, adiponectin receptor 1, ACDCR1, CGI45, PAQR1, TESBP1A, CGI-45
- External IDs: OMIM: 607945; MGI: 1919924; GeneCards: ADIPOR1
Available structures
PDB	Ortholog search: PDBe RCSB
PDB	List of PDB id codes 3WXV

Gene location (Human)
Chr.	Chromosome 1 (human)
Band	1q32.1	Start	202,940,826 bp
Band	1q32.1	End	202,958,572 bp

Gene location (Mouse)
Chr.	Chromosome 1 (mouse)
Band	1|1 E4	Start	134,343,116 bp
Band	1|1 E4	End	134,361,089 bp
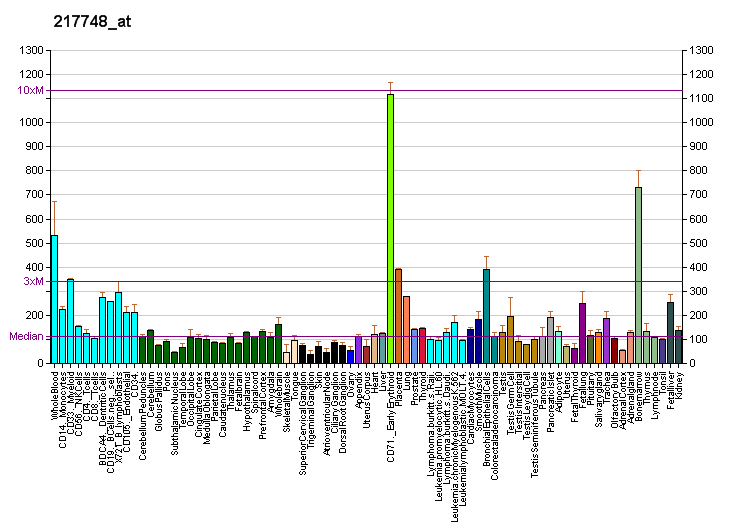
RNA expression pattern
Bgee	Human / Mouse (ortholog); Top expressed in: blood; monocyte; skin of leg; bone marrow; skin of abdomen; islet of Langerhans; olfactory zone of nasal mucosa; right lung; minor salivary glands; upper lobe of left lung / Top expressed in: blood; granulocyte; stroma of bone marrow; knee joint; fetal liver hematopoietic progenitor cell; neural layer of retina; triceps brachii muscle; atrium; medial head of gastrocnemius muscle; ankle; More reference expression data
BioGPS	More reference expression data
Gene ontology
Molecular function	adipokinetic hormone receptor activity; adiponectin binding; metal ion binding; identical protein binding; protein heterodimerization activity; protein kinase binding; signaling receptor activity
Cellular component	integral component of membrane; membrane; intrinsic component of plasma membrane; plasma membrane
Biological process	glucose homeostasis; lipid metabolism; leptin-mediated signaling pathway; adiponectin-activated signaling pathway; fatty acid metabolic process; regulation of lipid metabolic process; regulation of glucose metabolic process; negative regulation of cell growth; fatty acid oxidation; hormone-mediated signaling pathway; positive regulation of insulin receptor signaling pathway; positive regulation of receptor signaling pathway via JAK-STAT; negative regulation of epithelial to mesenchymal transition; negative regulation of receptor signaling pathway via JAK-STAT; negative regulation of epithelial cell migration; negative regulation of NIK/NF-kappaB signaling; G protein-coupled receptor signaling pathway; regulation of fatty acid biosynthetic process; positive regulation of cold-induced thermogenesis
Sources:Amigo / QuickGO
Orthologs
Databases	NCBI: entry; OMA: entry
Species	Human	Mouse
Entrez	51094	72674
Ensembl	ENSG00000159346	ENSMUSG00000026457
UniProt	Q96A54	Q91VH1
RefSeq (mRNA)	NM_001290553; NM_001290557; NM_001290629; NM_015999	NM_028320; NM_001306069
RefSeq (protein)	NP_001277482; NP_001277486; NP_001277558; NP_057083	NP_001292998; NP_082596
Location (UCSC)	Chr 1: 202.94 – 202.96 Mb	Chr 1: 134.34 – 134.36 Mb
PubMed search
- Wikidata
View/Edit Human	View/Edit Mouse

Adiponectin receptor 1 (AdipoR1) is a protein which in humans is encoded by the ADIPOR1 gene. It is a member of the progestin and adipoQ receptor (PAQR) family, and is also known as PAQR1.

== Structure ==
Similar to G protein-coupled receptors (GPCRs), AdipoR1 also possesses 7 transmembrane domains. However, AdipoR1 is orientated oppositely to GPCRs in the membrane (i.e., cytoplasmic N-terminus, extracellular C-terminus) and does not associate with G proteins.

== Function ==
The adiponectin receptors, AdipoR1 and AdipoR2, serve as receptors for globular and full-length adiponectin and mediate increased AMPK and PPAR-α ligand activities, as well as fatty acid oxidation and glucose uptake by adiponectin. In 2016, the University of Tokyo announced that it would launch an investigation into claims of fabrication of AdipoR1 and AdipoR2 identification data, as accused by an anonymous person/group called Ordinary researchers.

== Ligands ==
=== Agonists ===
==== Peptide ====
- Adiponectin
- ADP-355
- ADP-399

==== Non-peptide ====
- AdipoRon
- (−)-Arctigenin
- Arctiin
- Gramine
- Matairesinol

=== Antagonists ===
==== Peptide ====
- ADP-400

== See also ==
- Adiponectin receptor
- Adiponectin receptor 2
