= Membrane steroid receptor =

Membrane steroid receptors (mSRs), also called extranuclear steroid receptors, are a class of cell surface receptors activated by endogenous steroids that mediate rapid, non-genomic signaling via modulation of intracellular signaling cascades. mSRs are another means besides classical nuclear steroid hormone receptors (SHRs) for steroids to mediate their biological effects. SHRs can produce slow genomic responses or rapid, non-genomic responses in the case of mSRs.

== List of membrane steroid receptors ==
Known groups of mSRs, by ligand, include: (Note: Semicolons roughly denote structural groups, e.g. G-protein receptors from ion channels.)

- Membrane sex steroid receptors
  - Membrane androgen receptors (mARs) – GPRC6A, OXER1, ZIP9; TRPM8; Cav1.2, GPR133
  - Membrane estrogen receptors (mERs) – GPER, ER-X, ERx, G_{q}-mER; Nav1.2; palmitoylated nuclear receptors
  - Membrane progesterone receptors (mPRs) – PAQRs (mPRα, mPRβ, mPRγ, mPRδ, mPRϵ); PGRMC1, PGRMC2;
- Membrane corticosteroid receptors
  - Membrane glucocorticoid receptors (mGRs) – caveolin-associated nuclear receptors; possible unidentified receptors
  - Membrane mineralocorticoid receptors (mMRs) – caveolin-associated NRs; diverse putative receptors

In addition, PDIA3 is a membrane receptor for the secosteroid calcitriol, the activated form of Vitamin D.
