= Pharmacology of progesterone =

Pharmacology of progesterone can be divided into:

- Pharmacodynamics of progesterone
- Pharmacokinetics of progesterone

== See also ==
- Pharmacodynamics of estradiol
- Pharmacokinetics of estradiol
