= Progestogen =

Steroid hormone that activates the progesterone receptor

- Drug class
- Progesterone, the major progestogen in humans and a widely used medication.

Class identifiers
- Synonyms: Progestins; Progestagens; Gestagens,
- Use: Contraception, menopause, hypogonadism, transgender women, others
- ATC code: G03D
- Biological target: Progesterone receptors (PRA, PRB, PRC, mPRs (e.g., mPRα, mPRβ, mPRγ, mPRδ, others))

External links
- MeSH: D011372

Legal status

Progestogens, also sometimes written progestins, progestagens or gestagens, are a class of natural or synthetic steroid hormones that bind to and activate the progesterone receptors (PR). Progesterone is the major and most important progestogen in the body. The progestogens are named for their function in maintaining pregnancy (i.e., progestational), although they are also present at other phases of the estrous and menstrual cycles.

The progestogens are one of three types of sex hormones, the others being estrogens like estradiol and androgens/anabolic steroids like testosterone. In addition, they are one of the five major classes of steroid hormones, the others being the androgens, estrogens, glucocorticoids, and mineralocorticoids, as well as the neurosteroids. All endogenous progestogens are characterized by their basic 21-carbon skeleton, called a pregnane skeleton (C21). In similar manner, the estrogens possess an estrane skeleton (C18), and androgens, an androstane skeleton (C19).

The terms progesterone, progestogen, and progestin are mistakenly used interchangeably both in the scientific literature and in clinical settings. Progestins are synthetic progestogens and are used in medicine. Major examples of progestins include the 17α-hydroxyprogesterone derivative medroxyprogesterone acetate and the 19-nortestosterone derivative norethisterone. The progestins are structural analogues of progesterone and have progestogenic activity similarly, but differ from progesterone in their pharmacological properties in various ways.

In addition to their roles as natural hormones, progestogens are used as medications, for instance in menopausal hormone therapy and transgender hormone therapy for transgender women; for information on progestogens as medications, see the progesterone (medication) and progestogen (medication) articles.

== Types and examples ==
The most important progestogen in the body is progesterone (P4). Other endogenous progestogens, with varying degrees of progestogenic activity, include 16α-hydroxyprogesterone (16α-OHP), 17α-hydroxyprogesterone (17α-OHP) (very weak), 20α-dihydroprogesterone (20α-DHP), 20β-dihydroprogesterone (20β-DHP), 5α-dihydroprogesterone (5α-DHP), 5β-dihydroprogesterone (5β-DHP) (very weak), 3β-dihydroprogesterone (3β-DHP), 11-deoxycorticosterone (DOC), and 5α-dihydrodeoxycorticosterone (5α-DHDOC). They are all metabolites of progesterone, lying downstream of progesterone in terms of biosynthesis.

== Biological function ==
The major tissues affected by progestogens include the uterus, vagina, cervix, breasts, testes, and brain. The main biological role of progestogens in the body is in the female reproductive system, and the male reproductive system, with involvement in regulation of the menstrual cycle, maintenance of pregnancy, and preparation of the mammary glands for lactation and breastfeeding following parturition in women; in men progesterone affects spermiogenesis, sperm capacitation, and testosterone synthesis. Progestogens also have effects in other parts of the body.

== Biochemistry ==
=== Biosynthesis ===
Steroidogenesis, with progestogens and their precursors inside the yellow box.

Progesterone is produced from cholesterol with pregnenolone as a metabolic intermediate. In the first step in the steroidogenic pathway, cholesterol is converted into pregnenolone, which serves as the precursor to the progestogens progesterone and 17α-hydroxyprogesterone. These progestogens, along with another steroid, 17α-hydroxypregnenolone, are the precursors of all other endogenous steroids, including the androgens, estrogens, glucocorticoids, mineralocorticoids, and neurosteroids. Thus, many tissues producing steroids, including the adrenal glands, testes, and ovaries, produce progestogens.

In some tissues, the enzymes required for the final product are not all located in a single cell. For example, in ovarian follicles, cholesterol is converted to androstenedione, an androgen, in the theca cells, which is then further converted into estrogen in the granulosa cells. Fetal adrenal glands also produce pregnenolone in some species, which is converted into progesterone and estrogens by the placenta (see below). In the human, the fetal adrenals produce dehydroepiandrosterone (DHEA) via the pregnenolone pathway.

Production rates, secretion rates, clearance rates, and blood levels of major sex hormones
Sex	Sex hormone	Reproductive phase	Blood production rate	Gonadal secretion rate	Metabolic clearance rate	Reference range (serum levels)	
Sex	Sex hormone	Reproductive phase	Blood production rate	Gonadal secretion rate	Metabolic clearance rate	Molar concentration	Mass concentration
Men	Androstenedione	–	2.8 mg/day	1.6 mg/day	2200 L/day	2.8–7.3 nmol/L	80–210 ng/dL
Men	Testosterone	–	6.5 mg/day	6.2 mg/day	950 L/day	6.9–34.7 nmol/L	200–1000 ng/dL
Men	Estrone	–	150 μg/day	110 μg/day	2050 L/day	37–250 pmol/L	10–70 pg/mL
Men	Estradiol	–	60 μg/day	50 μg/day	1600 L/day	<37–210 pmol/L	10–57 pg/mL
Men	Estrone sulfate	–	80 μg/day	Insignificant	167 L/day	600–2500 pmol/L	200–900 pg/mL
Women	Androstenedione	–	3.2 mg/day	2.8 mg/day	2000 L/day	3.1–12.2 nmol/L	89–350 ng/dL
Women	Testosterone	–	190 μg/day	60 μg/day	500 L/day	0.7–2.8 nmol/L	20–81 ng/dL
Women	Estrone	Follicular phase	110 μg/day	80 μg/day	2200 L/day	110–400 pmol/L	30–110 pg/mL
Women	Estrone	Luteal phase	260 μg/day	150 μg/day	2200 L/day	310–660 pmol/L	80–180 pg/mL
Women	Estrone	Postmenopause	40 μg/day	Insignificant	1610 L/day	22–230 pmol/L	6–60 pg/mL
Women	Estradiol	Follicular phase	90 μg/day	80 μg/day	1200 L/day	<37–360 pmol/L	10–98 pg/mL
Women	Estradiol	Luteal phase	250 μg/day	240 μg/day	1200 L/day	699–1250 pmol/L	190–341 pg/mL
Women	Estradiol	Postmenopause	6 μg/day	Insignificant	910 L/day	<37–140 pmol/L	10–38 pg/mL
Women	Estrone sulfate	Follicular phase	100 μg/day	Insignificant	146 L/day	700–3600 pmol/L	250–1300 pg/mL
Women	Estrone sulfate	Luteal phase	180 μg/day	Insignificant	146 L/day	1100–7300 pmol/L	400–2600 pg/mL
Women	Progesterone	Follicular phase	2 mg/day	1.7 mg/day	2100 L/day	0.3–3 nmol/L	0.1–0.9 ng/mL
Women	Progesterone	Luteal phase	25 mg/day	24 mg/day	2100 L/day	19–45 nmol/L	6–14 ng/mL
Notes and sources Notes: "The concentration of a steroid in the circulation is determined by the rate at which it is secreted from glands, the rate of metabolism of precursor or prehormones into the steroid, and the rate at which it is extracted by tissues and metabolized. The secretion rate of a steroid refers to the total secretion of the compound from a gland per unit time. Secretion rates have been assessed by sampling the venous effluent from a gland over time and subtracting out the arterial and peripheral venous hormone concentration. The metabolic clearance rate of a steroid is defined as the volume of blood that has been completely cleared of the hormone per unit time. The production rate of a steroid hormone refers to entry into the blood of the compound from all possible sources, including secretion from glands and conversion of prohormones into the steroid of interest. At steady state, the amount of hormone entering the blood from all sources will be equal to the rate at which it is being cleared (metabolic clearance rate) multiplied by blood concentration (production rate = metabolic clearance rate × concentration). If there is little contribution of prohormone metabolism to the circulating pool of steroid, then the production rate will approximate the secretion rate." Sources: See template.

==== Ovarian production ====
Progesterone is the major progestogen produced by the corpus luteum of the ovary in all mammalian species. Luteal cells possess the necessary enzymes to convert cholesterol to pregnenolone, which is subsequently converted into progesterone. Progesterone is highest in the diestrus phase of the estrous cycle.

==== Placental production ====
The role of the placenta in progestogen production varies by species. In the sheep, horse, and human, the placenta takes over the majority of progestogen production, whereas in other species the corpus luteum remains the primary source of progestogens. In the sheep and human, progesterone is the major placental progestogen.

The equine placenta produces a variety of progestogens, primarily 5α-dihydroprogesterone and 5α,20α-tetrahydroprogesterone, beginning on day 60. A complete luteo-placental shift occurs by day 120–150.

== Chemistry ==
The endogenous progestogens are naturally occurring pregnane steroids with ketone and/or hydroxyl groups at the C3 and C20 positions.

== Medical use ==
Progestogens, including both progesterone and progestins, are used medically in hormonal birth control, hormone therapy, to treat gynecological disorders, to suppress sex hormone levels for various purposes, and for other indications.
