= Pharmacology of estradiol =

Pharmacology of estradiol can be divided into:

- Pharmacodynamics of estradiol
- Pharmacokinetics of estradiol

== See also ==
- Pharmacodynamics of progesterone
- Pharmacokinetics of progesterone
