= Monocyte to macrophage differentiation factor =

Protein in human genes

MMD

Identifiers
- Aliases: MMD, MMA, MMD1, PAQR11, monocyte to macrophage differentiation associated
- External IDs: OMIM: 604467; MGI: 1914718; GeneCards: MMD

Gene location (Human)
Chr.	Chromosome 17 (human)
Band	17q22	Start	55,392,622 bp
Band	17q22	End	55,421,924 bp

Gene location (Mouse)
Chr.	Chromosome 11 (mouse)
Band	11|11 C	Start	90,140,282 bp
Band	11|11 C	End	90,169,415 bp
RNA expression pattern
Bgee	Human / Mouse (ortholog); Top expressed in: nucleus accumbens; endothelial cell; orbitofrontal cortex; monocyte; Region I of hippocampus proper; amygdala; putamen; Brodmann area 46; buccal mucosa cell; entorhinal cortex / Top expressed in: subiculum; white adipose tissue; subdivision of hippocampus; Region I of hippocampus proper; olfactory tubercle; subcutaneous adipose tissue; amygdala; mammary gland; piriform cortex; prefrontal cortex; More reference expression data
BioGPS	n/a
Gene ontology
Molecular function	protein kinase activity; signaling receptor activity
Cellular component	lysosomal membrane; Golgi apparatus; integral component of plasma membrane; late endosome membrane; integral component of membrane; endosome; lysosome; membrane
Biological process	cytolysis; regulation of protein localization; positive regulation of neuron differentiation; positive regulation of protein kinase activity; protein phosphorylation; signal transduction
Sources:Amigo / QuickGO
Orthologs
Databases	NCBI: entry; OMA: entry
Species	Human	Mouse
Entrez	23531	67468
Ensembl	ENSG00000108960	ENSMUSG00000003948
UniProt	Q15546	Q9CQY7
RefSeq (mRNA)	NM_012329	NM_026178; NM_001395423
RefSeq (protein)	NP_036461	NP_080454; NP_001382352
Location (UCSC)	Chr 17: 55.39 – 55.42 Mb	Chr 11: 90.14 – 90.17 Mb
PubMed search
- Wikidata
View/Edit Human	View/Edit Mouse

Monocyte to macrophage differentiation factor also known as PAQR11 is a protein that in humans is encoded by the MMD gene. It is a member of the progestin and adipoQ receptor family. PAQR11 is a scaffold protein that is localized to the Golgi apparatus.
