= Membrane progesterone receptor =

Group of cell surface receptors for progesterone

Membrane progesterone receptors (mPRs) are a group of cell surface receptors and membrane steroid receptors belonging to the progestin and adipoQ receptor (PAQR) family which bind the endogenous progestogen and neurosteroid progesterone, as well as the neurosteroid allopregnanolone. Unlike the progesterone receptor (PR), a nuclear receptor which mediates its effects via genomic mechanisms, mPRs are cell surface receptors which rapidly alter cell signaling via modulation of intracellular signaling cascades. The mPRs mediate important physiological functions in male and female reproductive tracts, liver, neuroendocrine tissues, and the immune system as well as in breast and ovarian cancer.

The mPRs appear to be involved in the neuroprotective and antigonadotropic effects of progesterone and allopregnanolone. The progesterone active metabolites 5α-dihydroprogesterone, also a progestogen, and allopregnanolone, which are positive allosteric modulators of the GABA_{A} receptor, have been found to rapidly influence sexual receptivity and behavior in mice, actions that are GABA_{A} receptor-dependent.

These proteins are classified into three groups known as mPRα (PAQR7), mPRβ (PAQR8), mPRγ (PAQR5), mPRδ (PAQR6), and mPRϵ (PAQR9).

== mPR Subtypes ==
=== mPRα ===
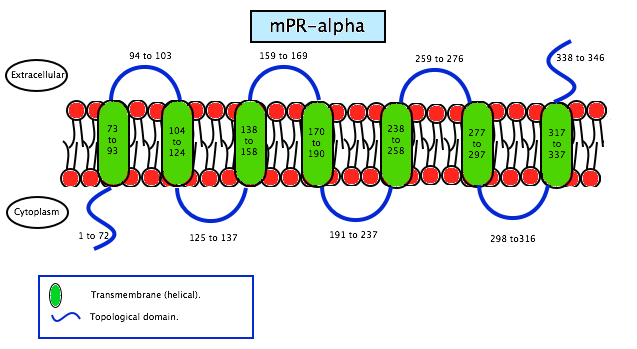
mPRα structure. This image is based on the following table.

Membrane progesterone receptor alpha (mPRα) is a protein that in humans is encoded by the PAQR7 gene. It is a steroid receptor which binds progesterone in vitro. Recent studies suggest the mPRα has important physiological functions in a variety of reproductive tissues. The mPRα is an intermediary in progestin induction of oocyte maturation and stimulation of sperm hyper motility in fish. In mammals, the mPRα has been implied in progesterone regulation of uterine functions in humans and GnRH secretion in rodents.

=== mPRβ ===
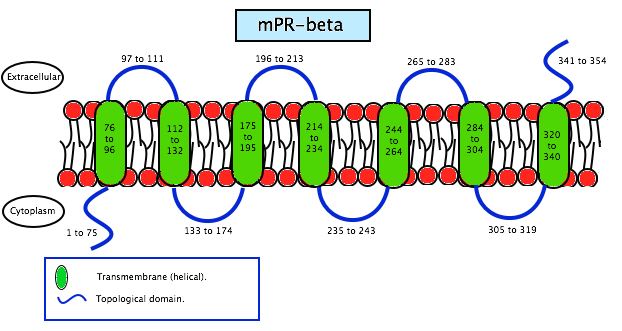
mPRβ structure. This image is based on the following table.

Membrane progesterone receptor beta (mPRβ) is a protein that in humans is encoded by the PAQR8 gene.

A recent study has investigated the role of mPRβ in regulating in vitro maturation (IVM) of pig cumulus-oocyte complexes (COCs). This study suggests that the mPRβ is a molecule related to cumulus expansion and it might function by regulation of exocytosis. The conclusion of this study is that mPRβ might play an important role on the function of the protein.

=== mPRγ ===
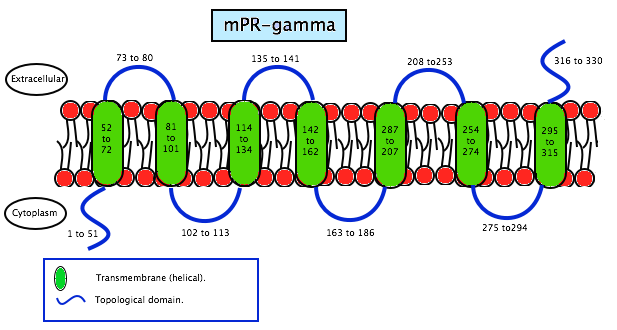
mPRγ structure. This image is based on the following table.

Membrane progesterone receptor gamma (mPRγ) is a protein that in humans is encoded by the PAQR5 gene.

A study about the mPRγ subtype has generated an antibody against this receptor in order to explore the role of mPRγ. Scientists found that mPRγ is expressed in female mouse reproductive tissues such as ovary and fallopian tube, and also in the lung and liver of both sexes. Immunohistochemical studies revealed that mPRγ is associated with the apical membrane of ciliated cells in the lumen of the fallopian tube, including human cells. That suggests a common role for mPRγ in the regulation of ciliary activity in the fallopian tube and the gamete transport in mammals. The presence of mPRγ in lung and liver of mice indicates that the receptor mediates the actions of progesterone outside the reproductive tract as well.

=== mPRδ ===
Membrane progesterone receptor delta (mPRδ) is a protein that in humans is encoded by the PAQR6 gene.

=== mPRϵ ===
Membrane progesterone receptor epsilon (mPRϵ) is a protein that in humans is encoded by the PAQR9 gene.

=== Summary table of features ===
Family members include:

mPR subtype	Gene	Length	Mass (Da)	Tissue specificity
mPRα	PAQR7	346	39,719	Ovary, testis, placenta, uterus, bladder, others
mPRβ	PAQR8	354	40,464	Brain, spinal cord, kidney, testis, others
mPRγ	PAQR5	330	38,014	Brain, lung, kidney, colon, adrenal, others
mPRδ	PAQR6	344	37,989	Brain, breast, others
mPRϵ	PAQR9	377	42,692	Brain, breast, others

The general functions of these subtypes of mPR are: being steroid membrane receptors and binding progesterone. They also may be involved in oocyte maturation.

== Potential roles ==
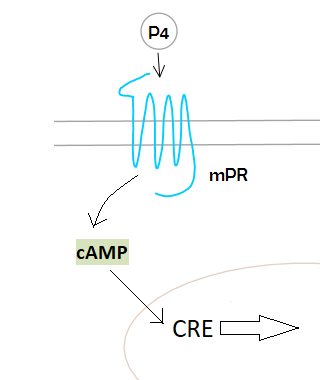
Membrane progesterone receptors can independently activate signaling pathways in cells. As seen in the example above, progesterone augmented cAMP levels increase cyclic AMP response element (CRE) transcriptional activity.This image is based on the following figure.

The discovery of a membrane located progesterone receptor (mPR) unrelated to the classical progesterone receptor (PR) in fish ovaries and its subsequent identification in mammal tissues suggests that mPRs could be a potential mediator of non-traditional progesterone actions, particularly in tissues where PR is absent. Even though classical PRs and mPRs can also have overlapping regional expression (e.g., both are expressed in the hippocampus, cortex, hypothalamus and cerebellum), their ligand specificity is not identical (for example mPRs bind to 17α-hydroxyprogesterone and 5-dihydroprogesterone with greater affinity than to the classical PRs).

Many of progesterone's actions are too fast to be readily explained by a genomic mechanism which typically occurs over a time scale of hours – like most of the classical functions of progesterone mediated by progesterone receptors PR-A and PR-B, which mediate progesterone’s regulation of diverse female vertebrate reproductive functions through altering gene transcription – and it is now widely accepted that progesterone can also exert fast cell surface-initiated actions within minutes through activation of membrane receptors and their associated intracellular signaling paths.

While some of the alternative progesterone actions are nongenomic, others may ultimately lead to altered gene transcription involving the activation of second messengers (such as MAP kinases) and through the alteration of progesterone receptors transactivation through effects on coactivators (such as SRC2).

Extensive evidence has been obtained by different research groups that wild-type mPRs in a wide range of vertebrate cells as well as recombinant proteins expressed in prokaryotic and eukaryotic systems display high-affinity, specific, displaceable and limited capacity progesterone binding characteristic of steroid membrane receptors. Therefore, membrane progesterone receptors are good candidates for the membrane receptors mediating many of the nonclassical cell surface-initiated progesterone actions, such as oocyte meiotic maturation, granulosa cell apoptosis, immunosuppression of T cells, breast and ovarian cells.

It has been found that allopregnanolone, an effective mPR ligand, can act as an mPR agonist at low physiologically relevant concentrations. This indicates an additional receptor mechanism by which neurosteroids can potentially modulate neural functions.

Experimental evidence also supports that mPRs are intermediaries in progestin-induced cell survival. MAP kinase and Akt are involved in inhibition of apoptosis, and it has been demonstrated that progestin activates MAP kinase and Akt through mPRs. This is a fact that consolidates mPR's antiapoptotic functions, and also their potential involvement in the antiapoptotic effects of allopregnanolone in the central nervous system.

MPRs are also considered potential intermediaries in progesterone modulation of GnRH secretion under certain conditions, but direct evidence is lacking.

== Structure ==
As the name says, mPRS are a group of proteins with a receptor function. This determines its location in the cell, the membrane. MPRs recognise some specific substances and facilitate the entrance of these substances inside compartments. Specifically, this receptors allow the entrance to the cell, therefore they are found in the plasmatic membrane. Studies have not revealed significant information about its structure so scientists still do not know exactly how this molecules are. In contrast, studies of the translated cDNAs based on the structure suggest they encode seven transmembrane domains. It also shows that mPRs have high affinity (Kd= 20-30 nm) saturable binding for progesterone – Kd is a constant of every enzyme which says the concentration of ligand needed in order to obtain the half of the saturation. Scientists went further on the study of the binding to the γ-subtype, revealing a specific binding for progesterone with a rate of association and dissociation of t1/2=2–8 minutes. MPRs have a molecular mass of approximately 40 kDa. This results suggest that it may exist a new family of steroid receptors, also with the characteristics of G protein-coupled receptors. Another fact that suggests that this mPR subtype may be a G protein-coupled receptor is that it functions as the intermediary in progesterone induction of the maturation of oocyte meiotic maturation in teleost fishes.

== Involvement in cancer ==
Progesterone takes part in the growth regulation of different kind of tumors, in part by its interactions with its intracellular receptors (PR). MPRs have been found in cancer cells and tissues as well. Their roles in the process are unclear but it has been suggested that, at least, this steroid hormone may inhibit tumor progression. Recently, it has been reported that membrane progesterone receptors (mPRs) are expressed in ovarian and breast cancer cells, and that progesterone could exert some actions through these receptors. The presence of functional mPRα, mPRβ, and mPRγ subtypes were detected in both cell lines as well as in breast tumor tissues.

In the case of the ovarian cancer, transcripts for two of the three mPRs, α and β, were differentially expressed in ovarian cystadenomas, borderline tumors, and carcinomas: while mPRα is expressed at significantly higher levels than the others, an increased expression of mPRβ has been noticed in mucinous carcinomas when compared to the other tumor types and normal tissues. Notably, the expression of mPRγ was significantly higher in endometrioid and clear cell carcinomas, which are closely related tumors. In one study, an increase in progesterone was shown to coincide with a reduced level of mPRγ and concomitant increase in the mPRα transcript levels.

Recent studies suggest that some progesterone actions in astrocytoma cells (the most common and malignant human brain tumors) may be mediated also by mPRs. Recently, it has also been discovered that mPRα and mPRβ are clearly expressed at mRNA and protein levels in astrocytoma cells whereas mPRγ was barely expressed in these cells.

== See also ==
- PGRMC1 and PGRMC2
- Membrane steroid receptor
