= Pharmacodynamics of estradiol =

The pharmacology of estradiol, an estrogen medication and naturally occurring steroid hormone, concerns its pharmacodynamics, pharmacokinetics, and various routes of administration.

Estradiol is a naturally occurring and bioidentical estrogen, or an agonist of the estrogen receptor, the biological target of estrogens like endogenous estradiol. Due to its estrogenic activity, estradiol has antigonadotropic effects and can inhibit fertility and suppress sex hormone production in both women and men. Estradiol differs from non-bioidentical estrogens like conjugated estrogens and ethinylestradiol in various ways, with implications for tolerability and safety.

Estradiol can be taken by mouth, held under the tongue, as a gel or patch that is applied to the skin, in through the vagina, by injection into muscle or fat, or through the use of an implant that is placed into fat, among other routes.

== Mechanism of action ==
Estradiol is an estrogen, or an agonist of the nuclear estrogen receptors (ERs), the estrogen receptor alpha (ERα) and the estrogen receptor beta (ERβ). In one study, the EC_{50} value of estradiol for the human ERα was 50 pM (0.05 nM) and for the human ERβ was 200 pM (0.2 nM). Estradiol is also an agonist of the membrane estrogen receptors (mERs), including the G protein-coupled estrogen receptor (GPER) (3–6 nM), G_{q}-coupled membrane estrogen receptor (G_{q}-mER), ER-X, and ERx. It is far more potent as an estrogen than are other natural and bioidentical estrogens like estrone and estriol. Given by subcutaneous injection in mice, estradiol is about 10-fold more potent than estrone and about 100-fold more potent than estriol. In addition, much of the estrogenic potency of estrone in vivo is actually due to conversion into estradiol.

Estradiol has little to no affinity for other steroid hormone receptors, including the androgen, progesterone, glucocorticoid, and mineralocorticoid receptors. It has weak affinity for the androgen receptor, with about 8% of relative binding affinity of testosterone according to one study, and shows agonistic activity at this receptor. However, estrogens circulate in the picomolar (10^{−12} M) range while androgens circulate in the nanomolar (10^{−9} M) to micromolar (10^{−6} M) range, and in accordance with this, estradiol is active as an estrogen in target tissues at approximately 1,000-fold lower concentrations than is testosterone. In addition, while estradiol did show activation of the androgen receptor in vitro at very high concentrations, its efficacy as an androgen receptor agonist was of such low potency that it was not possible to calculate an EC_{50} value for the activity. As such, the weak activity of estradiol at the androgen receptor is unlikely to be of biological significance at normal physiological concentrations.

The affinities of estradiol for the ERs are high (around 0.1 nM), and there is a relatively low quantity of about 10,000 to 20,000 ERs in the cytoplasm per cell in estrogen target tissues. Estradiol stays bound to the ERs for about 24 hours, which is longer than that of other estrogens such as estriol (6 hours). A prolonged duration of binding to the ERs (e.g., 9 to 12 hours for endometrial effects), as with estradiol, is necessary for full estrogenic responses in various tissues. The ERs downregulate with exposure to estradiol, and in accordance, the expression of the ERs is dependent on estradiol concentrations. Constant levels of estradiol may result in downregulation of the ERs and relatively diminished responses to estradiol, although this has not been assessed clinically. Once bound to estradiol, the ERs are ubiquitinated and degraded by proteasomes, which is a major mechanism of ER downregulation. The unbound ERα has an intracellular half-life of up to 5 days, but this shortens to 3–4 hours once bound to a ligand such as estradiol. Estrogen deprivation can easily increase sensitivity to estrogens like estradiol by 10,000-fold or more, demonstrating a profound capacity of the ERs for upregulation and downregulation. This increase in sensitivity is mediated by a 100-fold increase in ERs, as well as other mechanisms such as changes in coactivator sensitivity and degree of phosphorylation of transactivation factors. Progestogens like progesterone and androgens like testosterone downregulate the ERs in certain tissues such as the endometrium and breasts, among others. While progestogens may reduce the expression of ERs and progesterone receptors (PR) in the breasts of primates, the estrogen-induced proliferation of the mammary epithelium is not inhibited, but rather enhanced by progestogens.

Estradiol is a steroid and a lipophilic compound. As a result, it readily enters cells via simple passive diffusion through the lipid bilayer of the cell membrane. This is in contrast to hydrophilic estrogen conjugates such as estrone sulfate and estradiol glucuronide, which require active transport via specific membrane transport proteins to enter cells. The ERs are nuclear receptors that are mostly present in the cell nucleus. Upon binding of estradiol to an ER, the receptor dimerizes (combines) with another estradiol-bound ER. These ER dimers can be ERα–ERα or ERβ–ERβ homodimers or ERα–ERβ heterodimers. Once in the dimerized state, the estradiol-bound ER–ER complex binds to short estrogen response elements (EREs) (of the minimal nucleotide sequence 5'-GGTCANNNTGACC-3', where N is any nucleotide) in the promoter regions of estrogen-responsive genes on chromosomes, in turn modulating their expression. Some prominent examples ERE-containing and hence estrogen-modulated genes in humans include the genes encoding the proteins oxytocin, c-fos, c-myc, and transforming growth factor alpha (TGFα).

Affinities of estrogen receptor ligands for the ERα and ERβ
Ligand	Other names	Relative binding affinities (RBA, %)^{a}		Absolute binding affinities (K_{i}, nM)^{a}		Action
Ligand	Other names	ERα	ERβ	ERα	ERβ	Action
Estradiol	E2; 17β-Estradiol	100	100	0.115 (0.04–0.24)	0.15 (0.10–2.08)	Estrogen
Estrone	E1; 17-Ketoestradiol	16.39 (0.7–60)	6.5 (1.36–52)	0.445 (0.3–1.01)	1.75 (0.35–9.24)	Estrogen
Estriol	E3; 16α-OH-17β-E2	12.65 (4.03–56)	26 (14.0–44.6)	0.45 (0.35–1.4)	0.7 (0.63–0.7)	Estrogen
Estetrol	E4; 15α,16α-Di-OH-17β-E2	4.0	3.0	4.9	19	Estrogen
Alfatradiol	17α-Estradiol	20.5 (7–80.1)	8.195 (2–42)	0.2–0.52	0.43–1.2	Metabolite
16-Epiestriol	16β-Hydroxy-17β-estradiol	7.795 (4.94–63)	50	?	?	Metabolite
17-Epiestriol	16α-Hydroxy-17α-estradiol	55.45 (29–103)	79–80	?	?	Metabolite
16,17-Epiestriol	16β-Hydroxy-17α-estradiol	1.0	13	?	?	Metabolite
2-Hydroxyestradiol	2-OH-E2	22 (7–81)	11–35	2.5	1.3	Metabolite
2-Methoxyestradiol	2-MeO-E2	0.0027–2.0	1.0	?	?	Metabolite
4-Hydroxyestradiol	4-OH-E2	13 (8–70)	7–56	1.0	1.9	Metabolite
4-Methoxyestradiol	4-MeO-E2	2.0	1.0	?	?	Metabolite
2-Hydroxyestrone	2-OH-E1	2.0–4.0	0.2–0.4	?	?	Metabolite
2-Methoxyestrone	2-MeO-E1	<0.001–<1	<1	?	?	Metabolite
4-Hydroxyestrone	4-OH-E1	1.0–2.0	1.0	?	?	Metabolite
4-Methoxyestrone	4-MeO-E1	<1	<1	?	?	Metabolite
16α-Hydroxyestrone	16α-OH-E1; 17-Ketoestriol	2.0–6.5	35	?	?	Metabolite
2-Hydroxyestriol	2-OH-E3	2.0	1.0	?	?	Metabolite
4-Methoxyestriol	4-MeO-E3	1.0	1.0	?	?	Metabolite
Estradiol sulfate	E2S; Estradiol 3-sulfate	<1	<1	?	?	Metabolite
Estradiol disulfate	Estradiol 3,17β-disulfate	0.0004	?	?	?	Metabolite
Estradiol 3-glucuronide	E2-3G	0.0079	?	?	?	Metabolite
Estradiol 17β-glucuronide	E2-17G	0.0015	?	?	?	Metabolite
Estradiol 3-gluc. 17β-sulfate	E2-3G-17S	0.0001	?	?	?	Metabolite
Estrone sulfate	E1S; Estrone 3-sulfate	<1	<1	>10	>10	Metabolite
Estradiol benzoate	EB; Estradiol 3-benzoate	10	?	?	?	Estrogen
Estradiol 17β-benzoate	E2-17B	11.3	32.6	?	?	Estrogen
Estrone methyl ether	Estrone 3-methyl ether	0.145	?	?	?	Estrogen
ent-Estradiol	1-Estradiol	1.31–12.34	9.44–80.07	?	?	Estrogen
Equilin	7-Dehydroestrone	13 (4.0–28.9)	13.0–49	0.79	0.36	Estrogen
Equilenin	6,8-Didehydroestrone	2.0–15	7.0–20	0.64	0.62	Estrogen
17β-Dihydroequilin	7-Dehydro-17β-estradiol	7.9–113	7.9–108	0.09	0.17	Estrogen
17α-Dihydroequilin	7-Dehydro-17α-estradiol	18.6 (18–41)	14–32	0.24	0.57	Estrogen
17β-Dihydroequilenin	6,8-Didehydro-17β-estradiol	35–68	90–100	0.15	0.20	Estrogen
17α-Dihydroequilenin	6,8-Didehydro-17α-estradiol	20	49	0.50	0.37	Estrogen
Δ^{8}-Estradiol	8,9-Dehydro-17β-estradiol	68	72	0.15	0.25	Estrogen
Δ^{8}-Estrone	8,9-Dehydroestrone	19	32	0.52	0.57	Estrogen
Ethinylestradiol	EE; 17α-Ethynyl-17β-E2	120.9 (68.8–480)	44.4 (2.0–144)	0.02–0.05	0.29–0.81	Estrogen
Mestranol	EE 3-methyl ether	?	2.5	?	?	Estrogen
Moxestrol	RU-2858; 11β-Methoxy-EE	35–43	5–20	0.5	2.6	Estrogen
Methylestradiol	17α-Methyl-17β-estradiol	70	44	?	?	Estrogen
Diethylstilbestrol	DES; Stilbestrol	129.5 (89.1–468)	219.63 (61.2–295)	0.04	0.05	Estrogen
Hexestrol	Dihydrodiethylstilbestrol	153.6 (31–302)	60–234	0.06	0.06	Estrogen
Dienestrol	Dehydrostilbestrol	37 (20.4–223)	56–404	0.05	0.03	Estrogen
Benzestrol (B2)	–	114	?	?	?	Estrogen
Chlorotrianisene	TACE	1.74	?	15.30	?	Estrogen
Triphenylethylene	TPE	0.074	?	?	?	Estrogen
Triphenylbromoethylene	TPBE	2.69	?	?	?	Estrogen
Tamoxifen	ICI-46,474	3 (0.1–47)	3.33 (0.28–6)	3.4–9.69	2.5	SERM
Afimoxifene	4-Hydroxytamoxifen; 4-OHT	100.1 (1.7–257)	10 (0.98–339)	2.3 (0.1–3.61)	0.04–4.8	SERM
Toremifene	4-Chlorotamoxifen; 4-CT	?	?	7.14–20.3	15.4	SERM
Clomifene	MRL-41	25 (19.2–37.2)	12	0.9	1.2	SERM
Cyclofenil	F-6066; Sexovid	151–152	243	?	?	SERM
Nafoxidine	U-11,000A	30.9–44	16	0.3	0.8	SERM
Raloxifene	–	41.2 (7.8–69)	5.34 (0.54–16)	0.188–0.52	20.2	SERM
Arzoxifene	LY-353,381	?	?	0.179	?	SERM
Lasofoxifene	CP-336,156	10.2–166	19.0	0.229	?	SERM
Ormeloxifene	Centchroman	?	?	0.313	?	SERM
Levormeloxifene	6720-CDRI; NNC-460,020	1.55	1.88	?	?	SERM
Ospemifene	Deaminohydroxytoremifene	0.82–2.63	0.59–1.22	?	?	SERM
Bazedoxifene	–	?	?	0.053	?	SERM
Etacstil	GW-5638	4.30	11.5	?	?	SERM
ICI-164,384	–	63.5 (3.70–97.7)	166	0.2	0.08	Antiestrogen
Fulvestrant	ICI-182,780	43.5 (9.4–325)	21.65 (2.05–40.5)	0.42	1.3	Antiestrogen
Propylpyrazoletriol	PPT	49 (10.0–89.1)	0.12	0.40	92.8	ERα agonist
16α-LE2	16α-Lactone-17β-estradiol	14.6–57	0.089	0.27	131	ERα agonist
16α-Iodo-E2	16α-Iodo-17β-estradiol	30.2	2.30	?	?	ERα agonist
Methylpiperidinopyrazole	MPP	11	0.05	?	?	ERα antagonist
Diarylpropionitrile	DPN	0.12–0.25	6.6–18	32.4	1.7	ERβ agonist
8β-VE2	8β-Vinyl-17β-estradiol	0.35	22.0–83	12.9	0.50	ERβ agonist
Prinaberel	ERB-041; WAY-202,041	0.27	67–72	?	?	ERβ agonist
ERB-196	WAY-202,196	?	180	?	?	ERβ agonist
Erteberel	SERBA-1; LY-500,307	?	?	2.68	0.19	ERβ agonist
SERBA-2	–	?	?	14.5	1.54	ERβ agonist
Coumestrol	–	9.225 (0.0117–94)	64.125 (0.41–185)	0.14–80.0	0.07–27.0	Xenoestrogen
Genistein	–	0.445 (0.0012–16)	33.42 (0.86–87)	2.6–126	0.3–12.8	Xenoestrogen
Equol	–	0.2–0.287	0.85 (0.10–2.85)	?	?	Xenoestrogen
Daidzein	–	0.07 (0.0018–9.3)	0.7865 (0.04–17.1)	2.0	85.3	Xenoestrogen
Biochanin A	–	0.04 (0.022–0.15)	0.6225 (0.010–1.2)	174	8.9	Xenoestrogen
Kaempferol	–	0.07 (0.029–0.10)	2.2 (0.002–3.00)	?	?	Xenoestrogen
Naringenin	–	0.0054 (<0.001–0.01)	0.15 (0.11–0.33)	?	?	Xenoestrogen
8-Prenylnaringenin	8-PN	4.4	?	?	?	Xenoestrogen
Quercetin	–	<0.001–0.01	0.002–0.040	?	?	Xenoestrogen
Ipriflavone	–	<0.01	<0.01	?	?	Xenoestrogen
Miroestrol	–	0.39	?	?	?	Xenoestrogen
Deoxymiroestrol	–	2.0	?	?	?	Xenoestrogen
β-Sitosterol	–	<0.001–0.0875	<0.001–0.016	?	?	Xenoestrogen
Resveratrol	–	<0.001–0.0032	?	?	?	Xenoestrogen
α-Zearalenol	–	48 (13–52.5)	?	?	?	Xenoestrogen
β-Zearalenol	–	0.6 (0.032–13)	?	?	?	Xenoestrogen
Zeranol	α-Zearalanol	48–111	?	?	?	Xenoestrogen
Taleranol	β-Zearalanol	16 (13–17.8)	14	0.8	0.9	Xenoestrogen
Zearalenone	ZEN	7.68 (2.04–28)	9.45 (2.43–31.5)	?	?	Xenoestrogen
Zearalanone	ZAN	0.51	?	?	?	Xenoestrogen
Bisphenol A	BPA	0.0315 (0.008–1.0)	0.135 (0.002–4.23)	195	35	Xenoestrogen
Endosulfan	EDS	<0.001–<0.01	<0.01	?	?	Xenoestrogen
Kepone	Chlordecone	0.0069–0.2	?	?	?	Xenoestrogen
o,p'-DDT	–	0.0073–0.4	?	?	?	Xenoestrogen
p,p'-DDT	–	0.03	?	?	?	Xenoestrogen
Methoxychlor	p,p'-Dimethoxy-DDT	0.01 (<0.001–0.02)	0.01–0.13	?	?	Xenoestrogen
HPTE	Hydroxychlor; p,p'-OH-DDT	1.2–1.7	?	?	?	Xenoestrogen
Testosterone	T; 4-Androstenolone	<0.0001–<0.01	<0.002–0.040	>5000	>5000	Androgen
Dihydrotestosterone	DHT; 5α-Androstanolone	0.01 (<0.001–0.05)	0.0059–0.17	221–>5000	73–1688	Androgen
Nandrolone	19-Nortestosterone; 19-NT	0.01	0.23	765	53	Androgen
Dehydroepiandrosterone	DHEA; Prasterone	0.038 (<0.001–0.04)	0.019–0.07	245–1053	163–515	Androgen
5-Androstenediol	A5; Androstenediol	6	17	3.6	0.9	Androgen
4-Androstenediol	–	0.5	0.6	23	19	Androgen
4-Androstenedione	A4; Androstenedione	<0.01	<0.01	>10000	>10000	Androgen
3α-Androstanediol	3α-Adiol	0.07	0.3	260	48	Androgen
3β-Androstanediol	3β-Adiol	3	7	6	2	Androgen
Androstanedione	5α-Androstanedione	<0.01	<0.01	>10000	>10000	Androgen
Etiocholanedione	5β-Androstanedione	<0.01	<0.01	>10000	>10000	Androgen
Methyltestosterone	17α-Methyltestosterone	<0.0001	?	?	?	Androgen
Ethinyl-3α-androstanediol	17α-Ethynyl-3α-adiol	4.0	<0.07	?	?	Estrogen
Ethinyl-3β-androstanediol	17α-Ethynyl-3β-adiol	50	5.6	?	?	Estrogen
Progesterone	P4; 4-Pregnenedione	<0.001–0.6	<0.001–0.010	?	?	Progestogen
Norethisterone	NET; 17α-Ethynyl-19-NT	0.085 (0.0015–<0.1)	0.1 (0.01–0.3)	152	1084	Progestogen
Norethynodrel	5(10)-Norethisterone	0.5 (0.3–0.7)	<0.1–0.22	14	53	Progestogen
Tibolone	7α-Methylnorethynodrel	0.5 (0.45–2.0)	0.2–0.076	?	?	Progestogen
Δ^{4}-Tibolone	7α-Methylnorethisterone	0.069–<0.1	0.027–<0.1	?	?	Progestogen
3α-Hydroxytibolone	–	2.5 (1.06–5.0)	0.6–0.8	?	?	Progestogen
3β-Hydroxytibolone	–	1.6 (0.75–1.9)	0.070–0.1	?	?	Progestogen
Footnotes: ^{a} = (1) Binding affinity values are of the format "median (range)" (# (#–#)), "range" (#–#), or "value" (#) depending on the values available. The full sets of values within the ranges can be found in the Wiki code. (2) Binding affinities were determined via displacement studies in a variety of in-vitro systems with labeled estradiol and human ERα and ERβ proteins (except the ERβ values from Kuiper et al. (1997), which are rat ERβ). Sources: See template page.

Relative affinities of estrogens for steroid hormone receptors and blood proteins
Estrogen	Relative binding affinities (%)						
Estrogen	ER	AR	PR	GR	MR	SHBG	CBG
Estradiol	100	7.9	2.6	0.6	0.13	8.7–12	<0.1
Estradiol benzoate	?	?	?	?	?	<0.1–0.16	<0.1
Estradiol valerate	2	?	?	?	?	?	?
Estrone	11–35	<1	<1	<1	<1	2.7	<0.1
Estrone sulfate	2	2	?	?	?	?	?
Estriol	10–15	<1	<1	<1	<1	<0.1	<0.1
Equilin	40	?	?	?	?	?	0
Alfatradiol	15	<1	<1	<1	<1	?	?
Epiestriol	20	<1	<1	<1	<1	?	?
Ethinylestradiol	100–112	1–3	15–25	1–3	<1	0.18	<0.1
Mestranol	1	?	?	?	?	<0.1	<0.1
Methylestradiol	67	1–3	3–25	1–3	<1	?	?
Moxestrol	12	<0.1	0.8	3.2	<0.1	<0.2	<0.1
Diethylstilbestrol	?	?	?	?	?	<0.1	<0.1
Notes: Reference ligands (100%) were progesterone for the PR, testosterone for the AR, estradiol for the ER, dexamethasone for the GR, aldosterone for the MR, dihydrotestosterone for SHBG, and cortisol for CBG. Sources: See template.

Affinities and estrogenic potencies of estrogen esters and ethers at the estrogen receptors
Estrogen	Other names	RBA (%)^{a}	REP (%)^{b}	
Estrogen	Other names	ER	ERα	ERβ
Estradiol	E2	100	100	100
Estradiol 3-sulfate	E2S; E2-3S	?	0.02	0.04
Estradiol 3-glucuronide	E2-3G	?	0.02	0.09
Estradiol 17β-glucuronide	E2-17G	?	0.002	0.0002
Estradiol benzoate	EB; Estradiol 3-benzoate	10	1.1	0.52
Estradiol 17β-acetate	E2-17A	31–45	24	?
Estradiol diacetate	EDA; Estradiol 3,17β-diacetate	?	0.79	?
Estradiol propionate	EP; Estradiol 17β-propionate	19–26	2.6	?
Estradiol valerate	EV; Estradiol 17β-valerate	2–11	0.04–21	?
Estradiol cypionate	EC; Estradiol 17β-cypionate	?^{c}	4.0	?
Estradiol palmitate	Estradiol 17β-palmitate	0	?	?
Estradiol stearate	Estradiol 17β-stearate	0	?	?
Estrone	E1; 17-Ketoestradiol	11	5.3–38	14
Estrone sulfate	E1S; Estrone 3-sulfate	2	0.004	0.002
Estrone glucuronide	E1G; Estrone 3-glucuronide	?	<0.001	0.0006
Ethinylestradiol	EE; 17α-Ethynylestradiol	100	17–150	129
Mestranol	EE 3-methyl ether	1	1.3–8.2	0.16
Quinestrol	EE 3-cyclopentyl ether	?	0.37	?
Footnotes: ^{a} = Relative binding affinities (RBAs) were determined via in-vitro displacement of labeled estradiol from estrogen receptors (ERs) generally of rodent uterine cytosol. Estrogen esters are variably hydrolyzed into estrogens in these systems (shorter ester chain length -> greater rate of hydrolysis) and the ER RBAs of the esters decrease strongly when hydrolysis is prevented. ^{b} = Relative estrogenic potencies (REPs) were calculated from half-maximal effective concentrations (EC_{50}) that were determined via in-vitro β‐galactosidase (β-gal) and green fluorescent protein (GFP) production assays in yeast expressing human ERα and human ERβ. Both mammalian cells and yeast have the capacity to hydrolyze estrogen esters. ^{c} = The affinities of estradiol cypionate for the ERs are similar to those of estradiol valerate and estradiol benzoate (figure). Sources: See template page.

Selected biological properties of endogenous estrogens in rats
Estrogen	ER RBA (%)	Uterine weight (%)	Uterotrophy	LH levels (%)	SHBG RBA (%)
Control	–	100	–	100	–
Estradiol (E2)	100	506 ± 20	+++	12–19	100
Estrone (E1)	11 ± 8	490 ± 22	+++	?	20
Estriol (E3)	10 ± 4	468 ± 30	+++	8–18	3
Estetrol (E4)	0.5 ± 0.2	?	Inactive	?	1
17α-Estradiol	4.2 ± 0.8	?	?	?	?
2-Hydroxyestradiol	24 ± 7	285 ± 8	+^{b}	31–61	28
2-Methoxyestradiol	0.05 ± 0.04	101	Inactive	?	130
4-Hydroxyestradiol	45 ± 12	?	?	?	?
4-Methoxyestradiol	1.3 ± 0.2	260	++	?	9
4-Fluoroestradiol^{a}	180 ± 43	?	+++	?	?
2-Hydroxyestrone	1.9 ± 0.8	130 ± 9	Inactive	110–142	8
2-Methoxyestrone	0.01 ± 0.00	103 ± 7	Inactive	95–100	120
4-Hydroxyestrone	11 ± 4	351	++	21–50	35
4-Methoxyestrone	0.13 ± 0.04	338	++	65–92	12
16α-Hydroxyestrone	2.8 ± 1.0	552 ± 42	+++	7–24	<0.5
2-Hydroxyestriol	0.9 ± 0.3	302	+^{b}	?	?
2-Methoxyestriol	0.01 ± 0.00	?	Inactive	?	4
Notes: Values are mean ± SD or range. ER RBA = Relative binding affinity to estrogen receptors of rat uterine cytosol. Uterine weight = Percentage change in uterine wet weight of ovariectomized rats after 72 hours with continuous administration of 1 μg/hour via subcutaneously implanted osmotic pumps. LH levels = Luteinizing hormone levels relative to baseline of ovariectomized rats after 24 to 72 hours of continuous administration via subcutaneous implant. Footnotes: ^{a} = Synthetic (i.e., not endogenous). ^{b} = Atypical uterotrophic effect which plateaus within 48 hours (estradiol's uterotrophy continues linearly up to 72 hours). Sources:

== Effects in the body and brain ==
The ERs are expressed widely throughout the body, including in the breasts, uterus, vagina, prostate gland, fat, skin, bone, liver, pituitary gland, hypothalamus, and elsewhere throughout the brain. Through activation of the ERs (as well as the mERs), estradiol has many effects, including the following:

- Promotes growth, function, and maintenance of the breasts, uterus, and vagina during puberty and thereafter
- Mediates deposition of subcutaneous fat in a feminine pattern, especially in the breasts, hips, buttocks, and thighs
- Maintains skin health, integrity, appearance, and hydration and slows the rate of aging of the skin
- Produces the growth spurt and epiphyseal closure in both sexes during puberty, mediates widening of the hips in females during puberty, and maintains bone mineral density in both sexes throughout life
- Modulates hepatic protein synthesis, such as the production of sex hormone-binding globulin (SHBG) and numerous other proteins, with consequent effects on the cardiovascular system and various other systems
- Exerts negative feedback on the hypothalamic–pituitary–gonadal axis (HPG axis) by suppressing the secretion of the gonadotropins FSH and LH from the pituitary gland, thereby inhibiting gonadal sex hormone production as well as ovulation and fertility
- Regulates the vasomotor system and body temperature via the hypothalamus, thereby preventing hot flashes
- Modulates brain function, with effects on mood, emotionality, and sexuality, as well as cognition and memory
- Influences the risk and/or progression of hormone-sensitive cancers including breast cancer, prostate cancer, and endometrial cancer
- Downregulates the catabolism of anti-ferroptotic hydropersulfides and suppresses the transcription of pro-ferroptotic ether-lipid pathway proteins thereby protecting from ferroptotic cell death.

Estrogen has also been found to increase the secretion of oxytocin and to increase the expression of its receptor, the oxytocin receptor, in the brain. In women, a single dose of ethinylestradiol has been found to be sufficient to increase circulating oxytocin concentrations.

Potencies of oral estrogens
Compound	Dosage for specific uses (mg usually) (Note: Dosages are given in milligrams unless otherwise noted.)					
Compound	ETD (Note: Dosed every 2 to 3 weeks)	EPD	MSD	MSD (Note: Dosed daily)	OID	TSD
Estradiol (non-micronized)	30	≥120–300	120	6	-	-
Estradiol (micronized)	6–12	60–80	14–42	1–2	>5	>8
Estradiol valerate	6–12	60–80	14–42	1–2	-	>8
Estradiol benzoate	-	60–140	-	-	-	-
Estriol	≥20	120–150 (Note: In divided doses, 3x/day; irregular and atypical proliferation.)	28–126	1–6	>5	-
Estriol succinate	-	140–150	28–126	2–6	-	-
Estrone sulfate	12	60	42	2	-	-
Conjugated estrogens	5–12	60–80	8.4–25	0.625–1.25	>3.75	7.5
Ethinylestradiol	200 μg	1–2	280 μg	20–40 μg	100 μg	100 μg
Mestranol	300 μg	1.5–3.0	300–600 μg	25–30 μg	>80 μg	-
Quinestrol	300 μg	2–4	500 μg	25–50 μg	-	-
Methylestradiol	-	2	-	-	-	-
Diethylstilbestrol	2.5	20–30	11	0.5–2.0	>5	3
DES dipropionate	-	15–30	-	-	-	-
Dienestrol	5	30–40	42	0.5–4.0	-	-
Dienestrol diacetate	3–5	30–60	-	-	-	-
Hexestrol	-	70–110	-	-	-	-
Chlorotrianisene	-	>100	-	-	>48	-
Methallenestril	-	400	-	-	-	-
Sources and footnotes:

Relative oral potencies of estrogens
Estrogen	HF	VE	UCa	FSH	LH	HDL-C	SHBG	CBG	AGT	Liver
Estradiol	1.0	1.0	1.0	1.0	1.0	1.0	1.0	1.0	1.0	1.0
Estrone	?	?	?	0.3	0.3	?	?	?	?	?
Estriol	0.3	0.3	0.1	0.3	0.3	0.2	?	?	?	0.67
Estrone sulfate	?	0.9	0.9	0.8–0.9	0.9	0.5	0.9	0.5–0.7	1.4–1.5	0.56–1.7
Conjugated estrogens	1.2	1.5	2.0	1.1–1.3	1.0	1.5	3.0–3.2	1.3–1.5	5.0	1.3–4.5
Equilin sulfate	?	?	1.0	?	?	6.0	7.5	6.0	7.5	?
Ethinylestradiol	120	150	400	60–150	100	400	500–600	500–600	350	2.9–5.0
Diethylstilbestrol	?	?	?	2.9–3.4	?	?	26–28	25–37	20	5.7–7.5
Sources and footnotes Notes: Values are ratios, with estradiol as standard (i.e., 1.0). Abbreviations: HF = Clinical relief of hot flashes. VE = Increased proliferation of vaginal epithelium. UCa = Decrease in UCa. FSH = Suppression of FSH levels. LH = Suppression of LH levels. HDL-C, SHBG, CBG, and AGT = Increase in the serum levels of these liver proteins. Liver = Ratio of liver estrogenic effects to general/systemic estrogenic effects (hot flashes/gonadotropins). Sources: See template.

Potencies and durations of natural estrogens by intramuscular injection
Estrogen	Form	Dose (mg)		Duration by dose (mg)
Estrogen	Form	EPD	CICD	Duration by dose (mg)
Estradiol	Aq. soln.	?	–	<1 d
Estradiol	Oil soln.	40–60	–	1–2 ≈ 1–2 d
Estradiol	Aq. susp.	?	3.5	0.5–2 ≈ 2–7 d; 3.5 ≈ >5 d
Estradiol	Microsph.	?	–	1 ≈ 30 d
Estradiol benzoate	Oil soln.	25–35	–	1.66 ≈ 2–3 d; 5 ≈ 3–6 d
Estradiol benzoate	Aq. susp.	20	–	10 ≈ 16–21 d
Estradiol benzoate	Emulsion	?	–	10 ≈ 14–21 d
Estradiol dipropionate	Oil soln.	25–30	–	5 ≈ 5–8 d
Estradiol valerate	Oil soln.	20–30	5	5 ≈ 7–8 d; 10 ≈ 10–14 d; 40 ≈ 14–21 d; 100 ≈ 21–28 d
Estradiol benz. butyrate	Oil soln.	?	10	10 ≈ 21 d
Estradiol cypionate	Oil soln.	20–30	–	5 ≈ 11–14 d
Estradiol cypionate	Aq. susp.	?	5	5 ≈ 14–24 d
Estradiol enanthate	Oil soln.	?	5–10	10 ≈ 20–30 d
Estradiol dienanthate	Oil soln.	?	–	7.5 ≈ >40 d
Estradiol undecylate	Oil soln.	?	–	10–20 ≈ 40–60 d; 25–50 ≈ 60–120 d
Polyestradiol phosphate	Aq. soln.	40–60	–	40 ≈ 30 d; 80 ≈ 60 d; 160 ≈ 120 d
Estrone	Oil soln.	?	–	1–2 ≈ 2–3 d
Estrone	Aq. susp.	?	–	0.1–2 ≈ 2–7 d
Estriol	Oil soln.	?	–	1–2 ≈ 1–4 d
Polyestriol phosphate	Aq. soln.	?	–	50 ≈ 30 d; 80 ≈ 60 d
Notes and sources Notes: All aqueous suspensions are of microcrystalline particle size. Estradiol production during the menstrual cycle is 30–640 µg/d (6.4–8.6 mg total per month or cycle). The vaginal epithelium maturation dosage of estradiol benzoate or estradiol valerate has been reported as 5 to 7 mg/week. An effective ovulation-inhibiting dose of estradiol undecylate is 20–30 mg/month. Sources: See template.

=== Effects on sex-hormone levels ===
==== Antigonadotropic effects ====
Estrogens are powerful antigonadotropins at sufficiently high concentrations. By exerting negative feedback on the hypothalamic–pituitary–gonadal axis (HPG axis), they are able to suppress the secretion of the gonadotropins, LH and FSH, and thereby inhibit gonadal sex hormone production and circulating sex hormone levels as well as fertility (ovulation in women and spermatogenesis in men). Clinical studies have found that in men treated with them, estrogens can maximally suppress testosterone levels by about 95% or well into the castrate/female range (<50 ng/dL). This is equivalent to the reduction in testosterone levels achieved by orchiectomy and gonadotropin-releasing hormone analogue (GnRH analogue) therapy, corresponding to a complete shutdown of gonadal testosterone production. In addition, it is greater than that achieved with high-dose progestogens like cyproterone acetate and gestonorone caproate, which can maximally suppress testosterone levels in men by about 75%.

Inhibition of ovulation by estradiol monotherapy in women has been studied and demonstrated for oral estradiol, transdermal estradiol patches, subcutaneous estradiol implants, and intramuscular estradiol undecylate injections. A study of ovulation inhibition in women found that oral non-micronized estradiol was 55% effective at 1 mg/day, 61% effective at 2 mg/day, and 88% effective at 5 mg/day.

Suppression of testosterone levels by estradiol to within the castrate/female range (<50 ng/dL) in men requires relatively high levels of estradiol and has been associated with circulating levels of 200 to 300 pg/mL and above. However, although the castrate range in men has been defined as testosterone concentrations of less than 50 ng/dL, mean levels of testosterone with surgical castration are actually about 15 ng/dL. To achieve such levels of testosterone with estradiol therapy, higher concentrations of estradiol of about 500 pg/mL have been necessary to produce the requisite maximal suppression of testosterone production. Injected estradiol esters like polyestradiol phosphate, estradiol valerate, and estradiol undecylate, as well as high-dose estradiol transdermal patches, are used as a form of high-dose estrogen therapy to suppress testosterone levels into the castrate range in men with prostate cancer. High dosages of estradiol in various forms and routes are also used to suppress testosterone levels in transgender women. The suppression of testosterone levels by estradiol in men is rapid. A single intramuscular injection of 2 mg aqueous estradiol suppressed testosterone levels in young men from 760 ng/dL at baseline to 295 ng/dL (60% reduction) after 24 hours and to a maximum of 123 ng/dL (85% reduction) after 36 hours.

Lower dosages and concentrations of estradiol can also significantly suppress gonadotropin secretion and testosterone levels in men and transgender women. A retrospective study of oral estradiol monotherapy in transgender women found that dosages of 1 to 8 mg/day increased mean estradiol levels to about 50 to 150 pg/mL and suppressed mean testosterone levels to about 10 to 120 ng/dL. However, there was high interindividual variability in the estradiol and testosterone levels achieved, and testosterone levels were insufficiently suppressed in many even at 8 mg/day. In another study, a dosage of 1 mg/day oral micronized estradiol in healthy older men, which increased circulating estradiol levels by a relatively high amount of 6-fold (to 159 pg/mL), estrone levels by 15-fold (to 386 pg/mL), and SHBG levels by 17%, was found to suppress total testosterone levels by 27% (to 436 ng/dL) and free testosterone levels by 34% (to 11.8 ng/dL). A pharmacodynamic study of testosterone suppression by polyestradiol phosphate in men with prostate cancer found that estradiol levels of about 135 pg/mL (500 pmol/L) would decrease testosterone levels by 50% (from 430 ng/dL to 215 ng/dL), while estradiol levels of about 410 to 545 pg/mL (1500–2000 pmol/L) would decrease testosterone levels well into the castrate range to about 6 to 12 ng/dL (0.2–0.4 nmol/L).

Oral conjugated estrogens at a dosage of 7.5 mg/day has been found to suppress total testosterone levels in men to an equivalent extent as 3 mg/day oral diethylstilbestrol, which is the minimum dosage of diethylstilbestrol required to consistently suppress total testosterone levels into the castrate range (<50 ng/dL). The equivalent dosage in the case of oral estradiol has not been reported. However, on the basis of the results of one study, it appears to be greater than 8 mg/day. In addition, oral estradiol is known to have similar or slightly lower antigonadotropic potency than oral conjugated estrogens; the potencies of oral conjugated estrogens in terms of suppression of LH and FSH levels are 1.0 and 1.1–1.3 relative to oral estradiol, respectively.

In addition to their antigonadotropic effects, high doses of estrogens appear to have direct toxic effects in the testes. Following long-term therapy (>3 years) with high-dose estrogen therapy, testosterone levels fail to return to normal upon discontinuation of treatment in men with prostate cancer. Long-lasting suppression of pituitary gland function, persisting after estrogen discontinuation, may also be involved. With shorter-term estrogen therapy, testicular morphology has been reported to return to normal within 18 to 24 months following estrogen discontinuation.

Antigonadotropic effects of estradiol
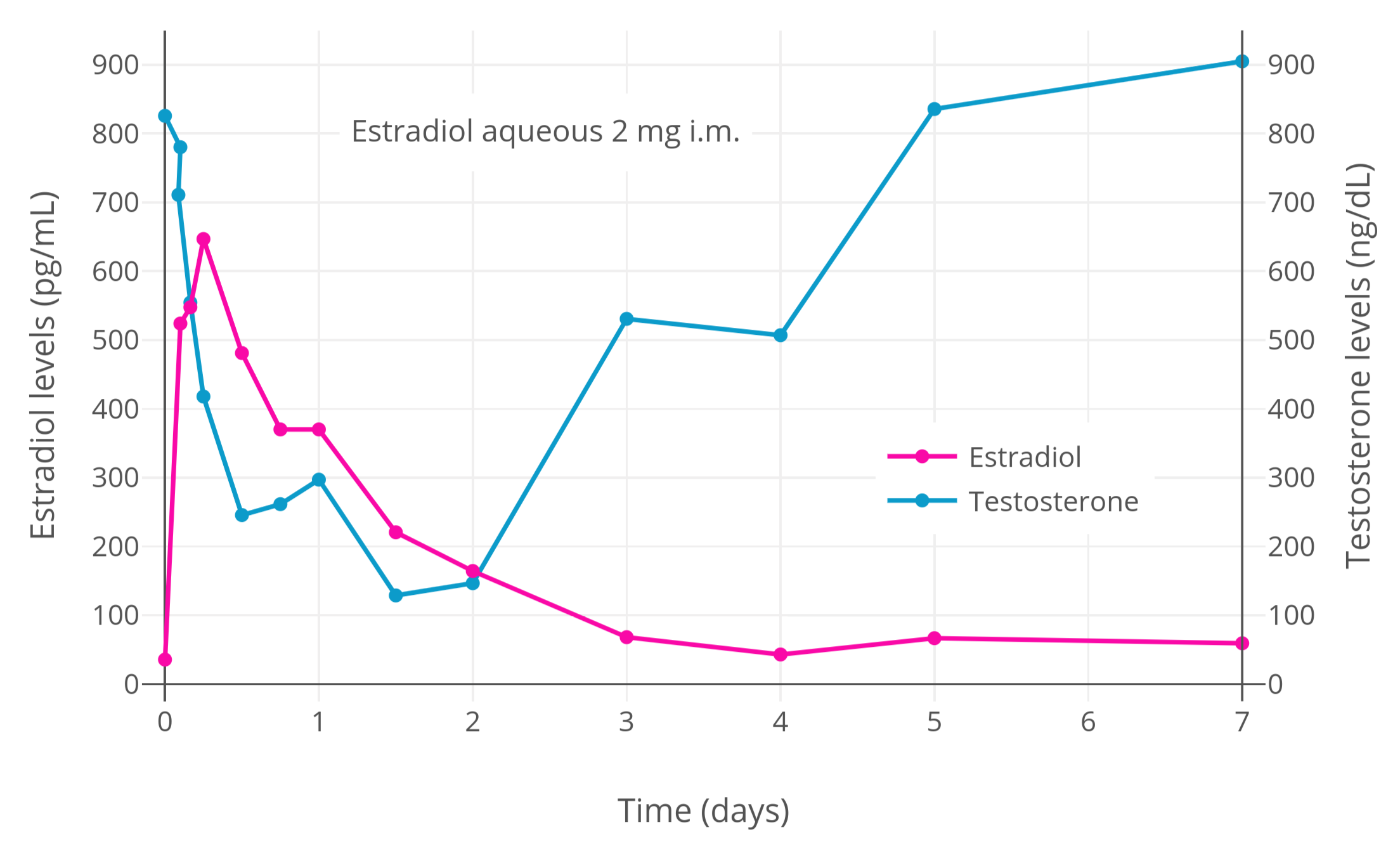
Estradiol and testosterone levels with a single intramuscular injection of 2 mg estradiol in an aqueous preparation in healthy young men. Type of aqueous (solution or suspension) was not specified.

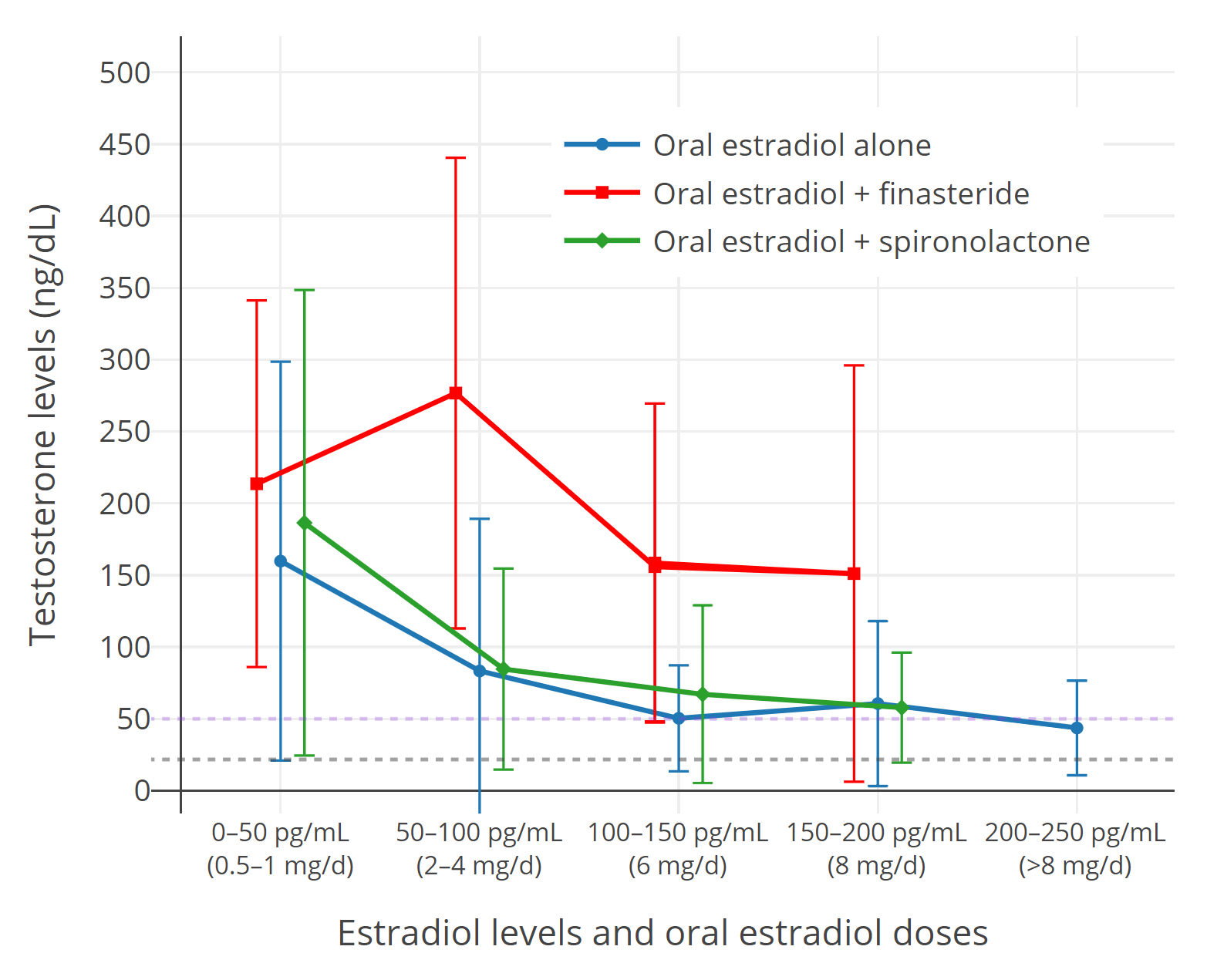
Testosterone levels in relation to estradiol levels (and corresponding estradiol dosages) during therapy with oral estradiol alone or in combination with an antiandrogen in transgender women. Dashed purple line is upper limit for female/castrate range (~50 ng/dL) and dashed grey line is testosterone level in a comparison group of post-operative transgender women (21.7 pg/mL).

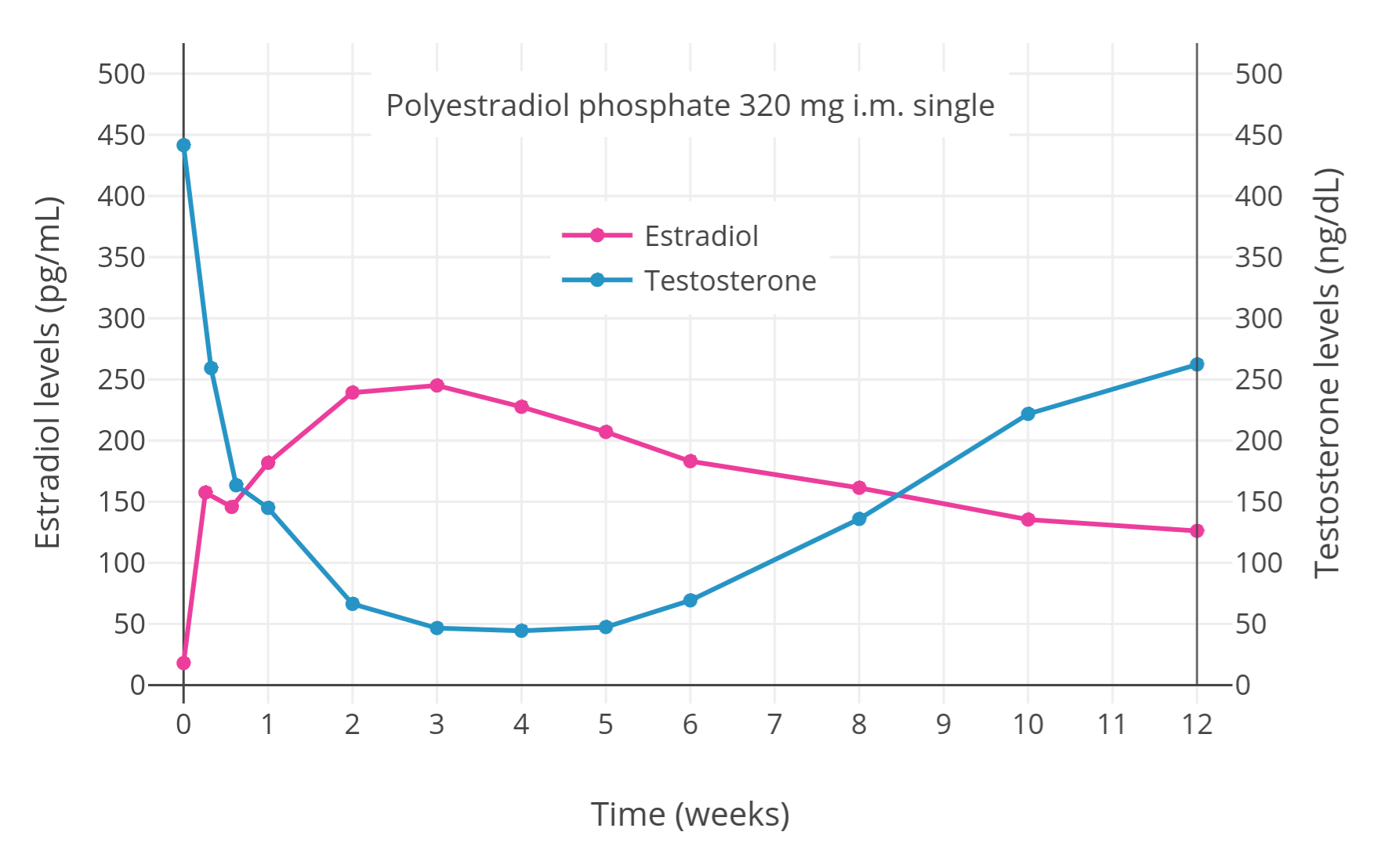
Estradiol and testosterone levels over the course of 12 weeks following a single intramuscular injection of 320 mg polyestradiol phosphate in men with prostate cancer.

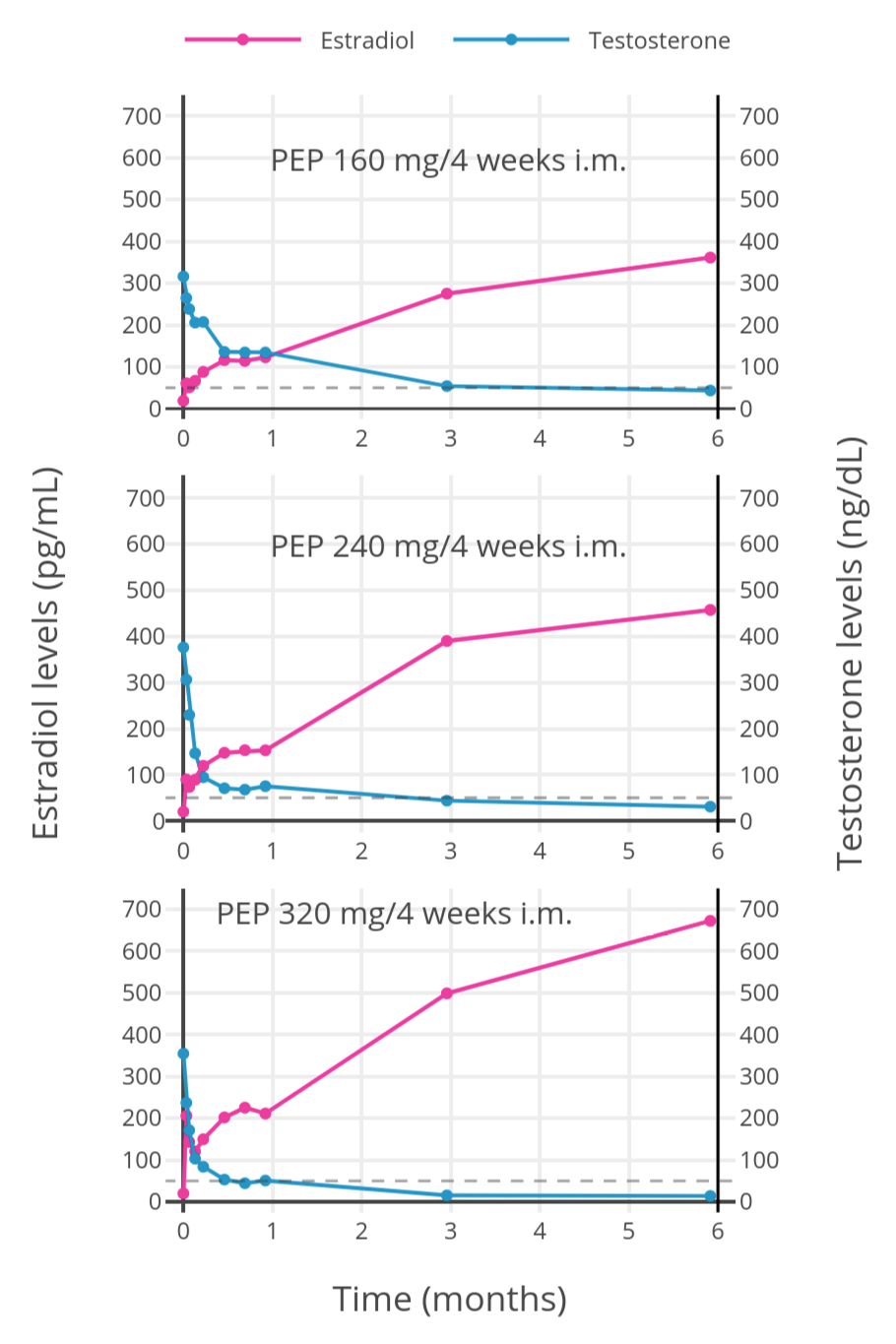
Estradiol and testosterone levels with polyestradiol phosphate 160, 240, or 320 mg once every 4 weeks by intramuscular injection in men with prostate cancer.

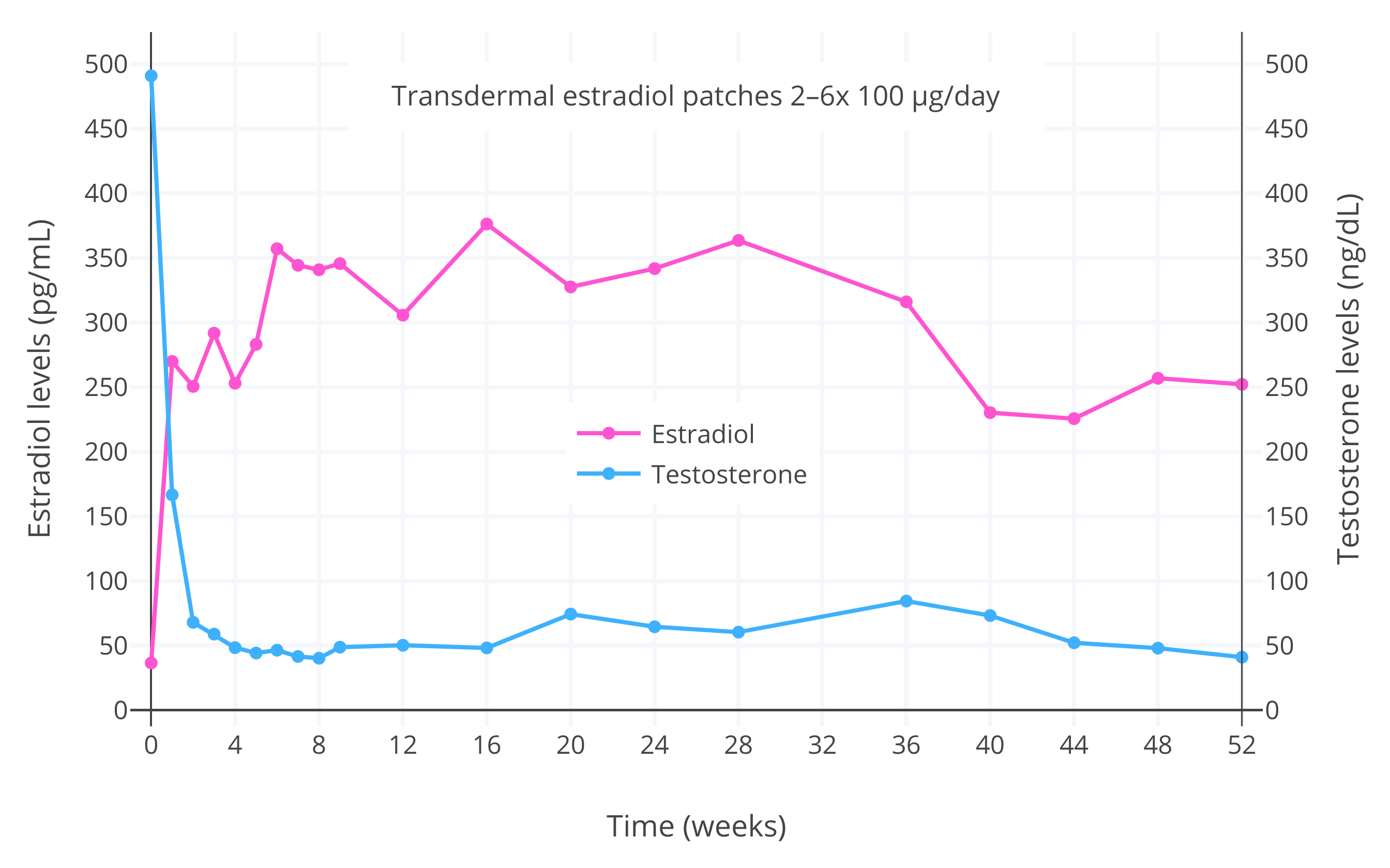
Estradiol and testosterone levels with high-dosage transdermal estradiol in the form of two to six 100 μg/day estradiol patches (Progynova TS forte) in men with prostate cancer.

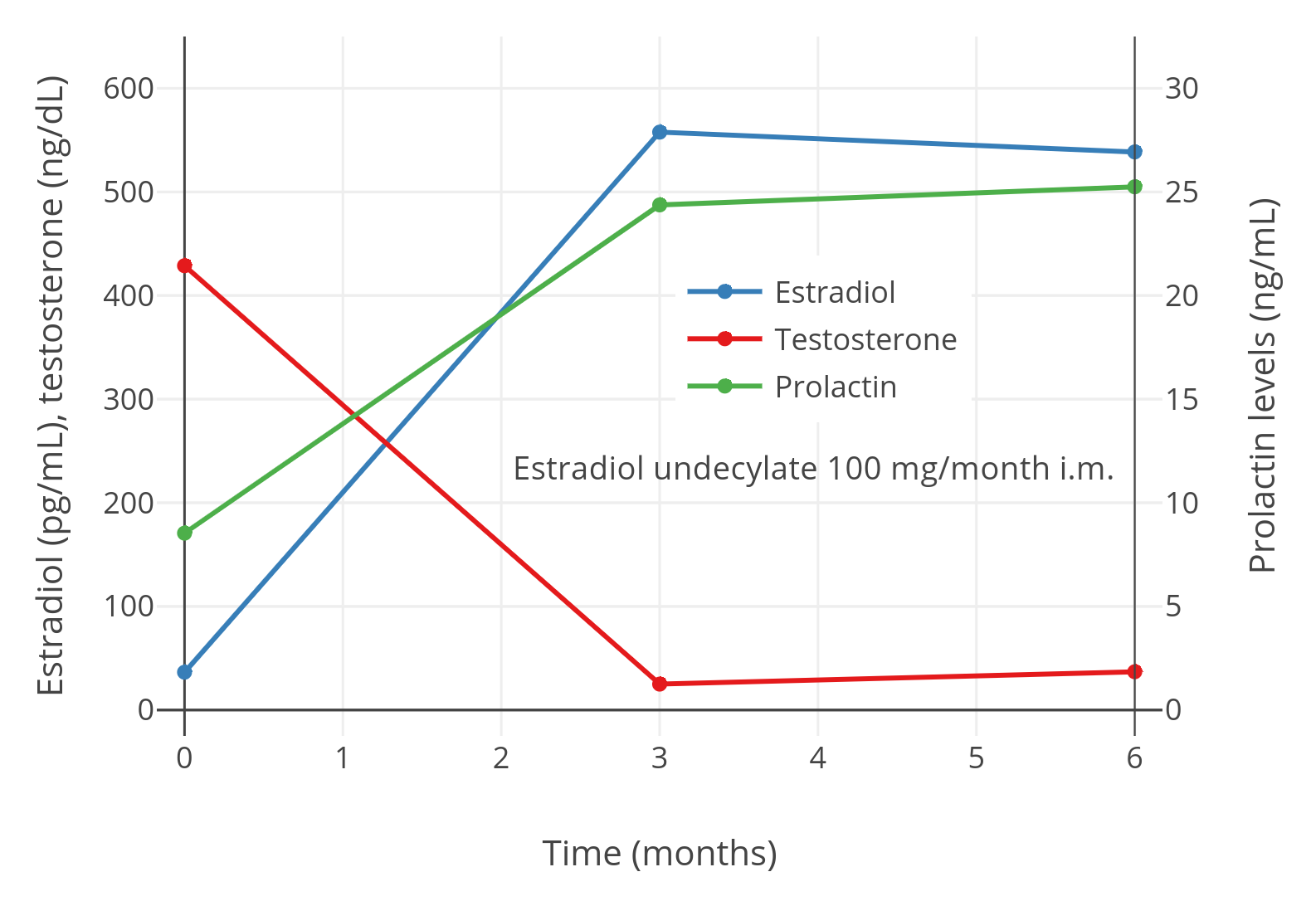
Estradiol, testosterone, and prolactin levels with 100 mg/month estradiol undecylate by intramuscular injection in men with prostate cancer.

==== Progonadotropic effects ====
Generally, estrogens are antigonadotropic and inhibit gonadotropin secretion. However, in women, a sharp increase in estradiol levels to about 200 to 500 pg/mL occurs at the end of the follicular phase (mid-cycle) during the normal menstrual cycle and paradoxically triggers a surge in LH and FSH secretion. This occurs when estradiol concentrations reach levels of about 250 to 300 pg/mL. During the mid-cycle surge, LH levels increase by 3- to 12-fold and FSH levels increase by 2- to 4-fold. The surge lasts about 24 to 36 hours and triggers ovulation, the rupture of the dominant ovarian follicle and the release of the egg from the ovary into the oviduct. This estrogen-mediated gonadotropin surge effect has also been found to occur with exogenous estrogen, including in transgender women on hormone therapy and pre-hormone therapy transgender men acutely challenged with a high dose of an estrogen, but does not occur in men, pre-hormone therapy transgender women, or transgender men on hormone therapy, hence indicating a hormonally-based sex difference. Progestogens have antiestrogenic actions on the progonadotropic effects of estrogens and a sufficient amount of progesterone (corresponding to levels greater than 2 ng/mL) or a progestin prevents the mid-cycle estradiol-induced surge in gonadotropin levels in women. This is how progestins prevent ovulation and in part mediate their contraceptive effects in women.

==== Effects on adrenal androgen levels ====
In addition to their antigonadotropic effects, estrogens at high concentrations can significantly decrease androgen production by the adrenal glands. A study found that treatment with a high dosage of ethinylestradiol (100 μg/day) reduced circulating adrenal androgen levels by 27 to 48% in transgender women. Another study found similar effects in men with prostate cancer, with levels of the adrenal androgens dehydroepiandrosterone (DHEA), dehydroepiandrosterone sulfate (DHEA-S), and androstenedione (A4) all decreasing significantly more with high-dose estrogen therapy (oral ethinylestradiol plus intramuscular polyestradiol phosphate) than with orchiectomy (by 33–39% and 10–26%, respectively).

However, studies have found that these effects occur with high-dose oral and synthetic estrogens such as ethinylestradiol and estramustine phosphate but minimally with the parenteral bioidentical estrogens polyestradiol phosphate and estradiol undecylate, suggesting that decreases in adrenal androgen levels are secondary to changes in liver protein synthesis rather than due to a direct action in the adrenal cortex, and that such changes will only occur in the context of strong hepatic impact. Cortisol levels were unchanged in the other groups (e.g., orchiectomy, GnRH agonist therapy, and parenteral estrogen therapy) in this study, but increased by 300 to 400% in the oral and synthetic estrogen groups, likely secondary to increases in hepatic corticosteroid-binding globulin (CBG) production and compensatory upregulation of adrenal corticosteroid synthesis.

Changes in levels of weak adrenal androgens are of relevance as these androgens serve as circulating reservoir of precursors that are transformed in tissues into potent androgens like testosterone and dihydrotestosterone and into estrogens.

=== Effects on liver protein synthesis ===
Estradiol and other estrogens modulate liver protein synthesis via activation of hepatic ERs. Estradiol increases the production and by extension circulating levels of sex hormone-binding globulin (SHBG), corticosteroid-binding globulin (CBG), angiotensinogen (AGT), pregnancy zone protein (PZP), coagulation factors, and numerous other hepatic proteins. Conversely, estradiol decreases hepatic synthesis and by extension circulating levels of insulin-like growth factor 1 (IGF-1). The effects of estradiol on liver protein synthesis are moderated by route of administration, with oral administration having 4- or 5-fold stronger effects on liver protein synthesis than doses by the transdermal route with equivalent general/systemic estrogenic potency. The influences of estradiol on liver protein synthesis have a variety of effects in the body, with implications for the bioavailability of androgens and the cardiovascular system.

The influence of 2 mg/day oral estradiol on levels of hepatic proteins such as SHBG, CBG, and AGT is much lower than that with 10 μg/day oral ethinylestradiol. Vaginal micronized estradiol at 0.25 mg/day increased SHBG levels by about 10% after 2 weeks of therapy in women. Estradiol-containing birth control pills, which contain 1 to 3 mg/day estradiol or estradiol valerate, have been found to increase SHBG levels by 1.5-fold. Both oral estradiol valerate at 6 mg/day and intramuscular estradiol valerate at 10 mg every 10 days have been found to increase SHBG levels by 2.5- to 3-fold in transgender women. For comparison, combined birth control pills containing ethinylestradiol and a progestin with minimal androgenic or antiandrogenic activity have been found to increase SHBG levels by about 3- to 4-fold. High-dose polyestradiol phosphate by intramuscular injection has been found to increase SHBG levels by about 1.5-fold.

Estradiol valerate in oil solution by intramuscular injection has been studied in the treatment of prostate cancer. Although parenteral estradiol has diminished effects on liver protein synthesis and by extension coagulation and cardiovascular risk compared to oral estradiol and non-bioidentical estrogens, a property attributable to its absence of disproportionate effects on the liver, sufficient doses of parenteral estradiol can nonetheless result in high estradiol concentrations in the liver and may increase coagulation and cardiovascular risk similarly. Estradiol valerate at a dose of 10 to 40 mg by intramuscular injection once every 2 weeks in men with prostate cancer has been found to increase markers of coagulation and plasminogen system activation such as levels of thrombin–antithrombin complex and quantitative D-dimers. Administration of daily prophylactic anticoagulation in the form of low molecular-weight heparin was able to successfully return these hemostasis markers to baseline. Doses of estradiol valerate of 10 to 40 mg by intramuscular injection have also been used to limit bleeding in women with hemorrhage due to dysfunctional uterine bleeding, although this is due primarily to stimulation of uterine growth.

Biochemical parameters affected by estrogen therapy
Proteins, general		Coagulation factors	
Compound	Effect	Compound	Effect
α_{1}-Antitrypsin	+	Antithrombin III	−
Albumin	−	C-reactive protein	+
Alkaline phosphatase	+	Coagulation factor II	+
Angiotensinogen	+	Coagulation factor VII	+
Bilirubin	+	Coagulation factor VIII	+
Ceruloplasmin	+	Coagulation factor IX	+
Corticosteroid-binding globulin (transcortin)	+	Coagulation factor X	+
χ-Glutamyl transpeptidase	+	Coagulation factor XII	+
Growth hormone	+	Fibrinogen	+
Growth hormone-binding protein	+	Plasminogen	+
Insulin-like growth factor 1	−	Protein C	+
Haptoglobin	−	Prothrombin time	−
Leucyl aminopeptidase	+	Lipids	
α_{2}-Microglobulin	+	Compound	Effect
Orosomucoid (α_{1}-acid glycoprotein)	−	Apolipoprotein A	+
Pregnancy zone protein	+	High-density lipoprotein	+
Retinol-binding protein	+	Low-density lipoprotein	−
Sex hormone-binding globulin	+	Lecithin	+
Thyroxine-binding globulin	+	Total lipids	+
Transferrin	+	Triglycerides	+
Key: + = Increased. − = Decreased. Sources: See template.

=== Other effects ===
Estrogens have been reported to downregulate androgen receptor expression in adipose tissue, and may thereby inhibit the effects of androgens on fat distribution.

== Differences from other estrogens ==
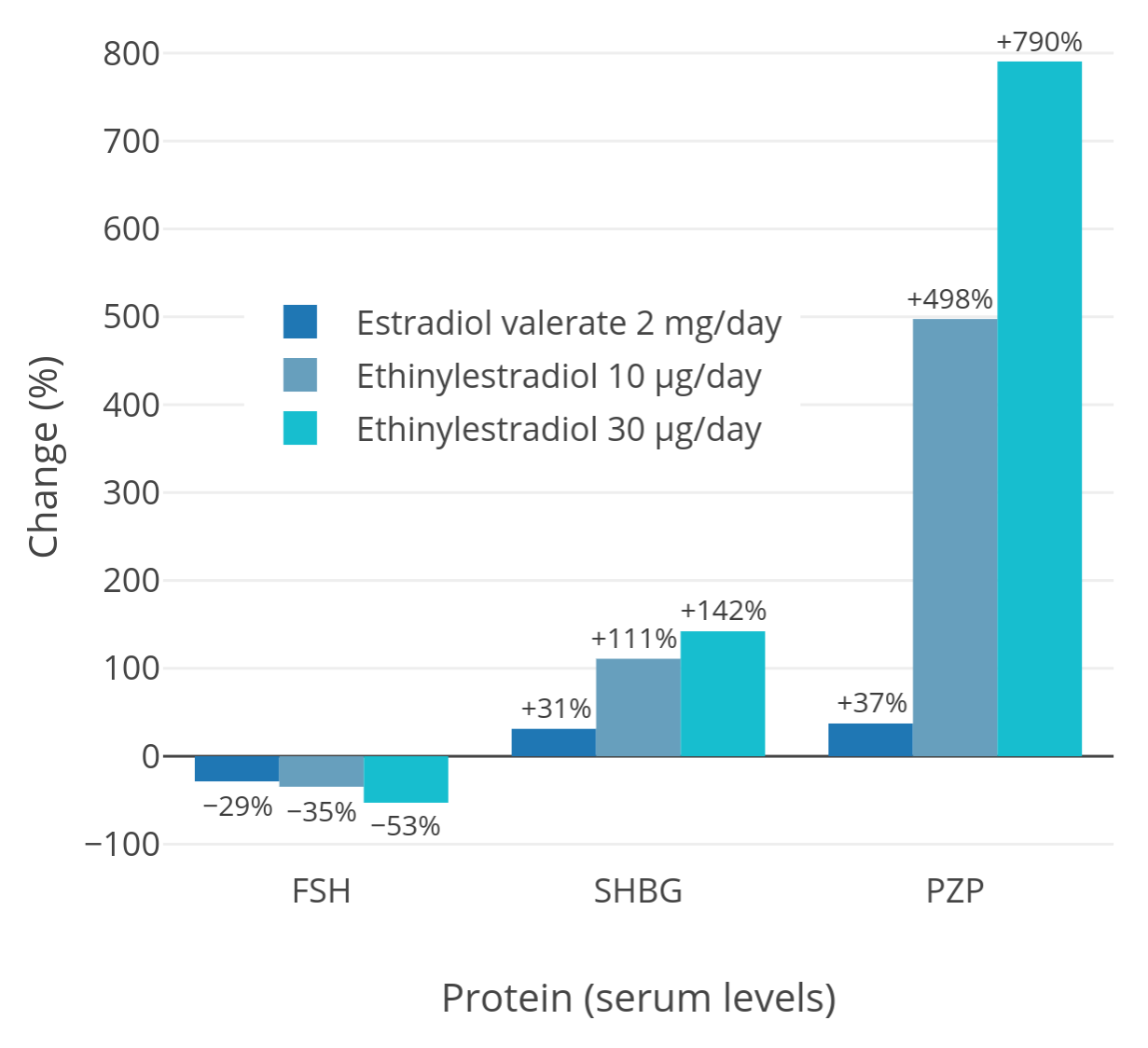
Changes in levels of estrogen-sensitive proteins after treatment with oral estradiol or oral ethinylestradiol in postmenopausal women. FSH is a pituitary protein and represents general/systemic estrogenic effect, while SHBG and PZP are hepatic proteins and represent liver estrogenic effect.

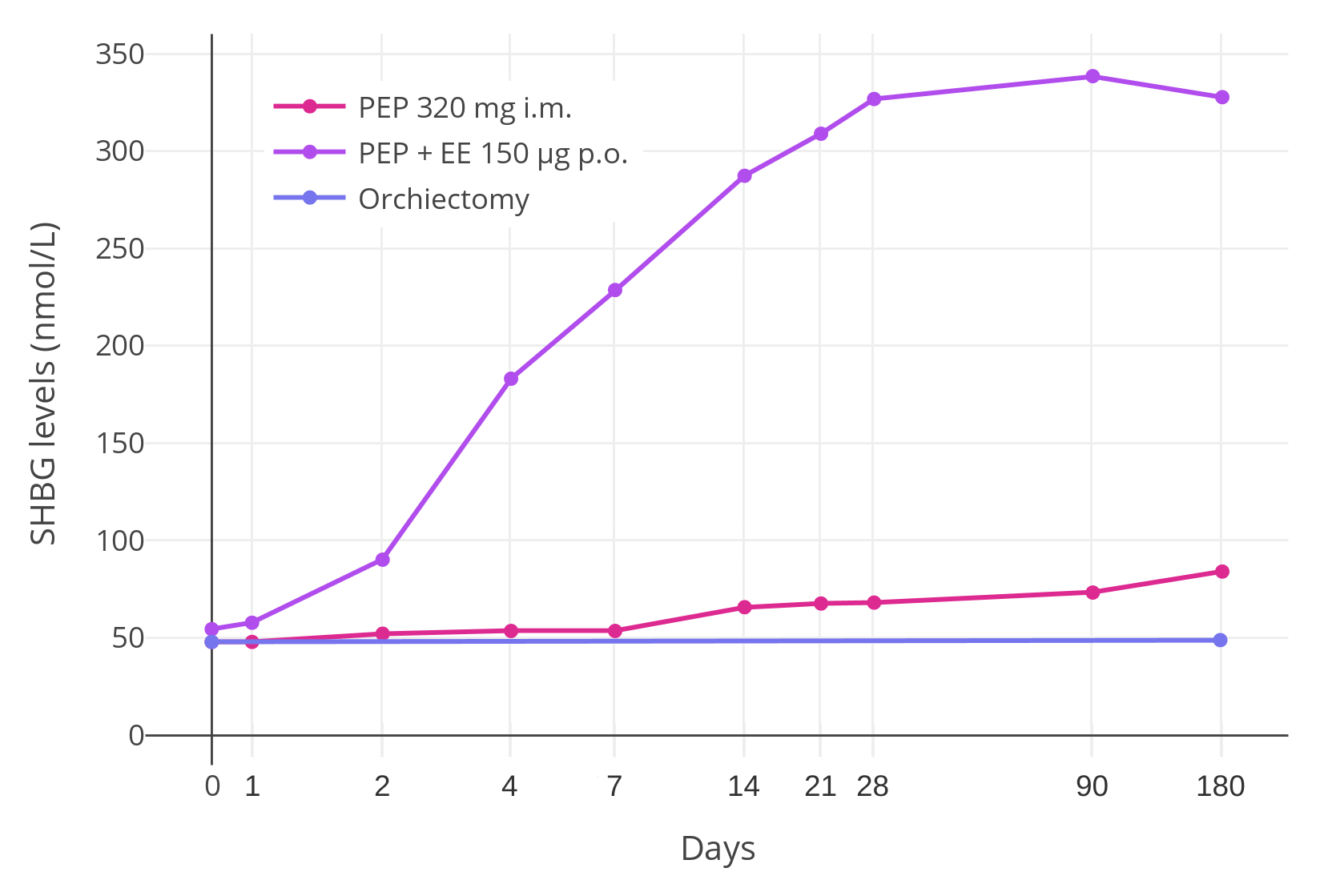
SHBG levels in men with 1) intramuscular injection of 320 mg polyestradiol phosphate once every 4 weeks alone; 2) the combination of intra- muscular injection of 80 mg polyestradiol phosphate once every 4 weeks plus 150 μg/day oral ethinylestradiol; 3) orchiectomy only.

Estradiol has relatively low oral bioavailability of about 5%. In addition, there is considerable interindividual variability in levels of estradiol achieved with oral estradiol. In contrast to estradiol, the synthetic estrogen ethinylestradiol has about 45% oral bioavailability, around 80- to 200-fold greater systemic oral estrogenic potency, roughly 500- to 1,500-fold greater hepatic oral estrogenic potency, and less interindividual variability in circulating estrogen levels achieved. An oral dose of ethinylestradiol that is approximately 100-fold lower than that of estradiol achieves similar maximal circulating estrogen concentrations (e.g., 50 pg/mL ethinylestradiol with a single 20 μg dose of ethinylestradiol relative to 40 pg/mL estradiol with a single 2 mg dose of micronized estradiol or estradiol valerate). These differences are due to the introduction of an ethynyl group at the C17α position in ethinylestradiol (also known as 17α-ethynylestradiol), which results in steric hindrance and greatly diminishes the first-pass metabolism of ethinylestradiol relative to estradiol with oral administration. Estradiol and ethinylestradiol have similar affinities for and efficacies as agonists of the ERs, and the systemic estrogenic potency of estradiol and ethinylestradiol is similar when they are administered by the intravenous route.

Synthetic estrogens like ethinylestradiol and diethylstilbestrol and the natural but animal-derived conjugated estrogens have disproportionate effects on liver protein synthesis relative to their effects in other tissues when compared to estradiol. At doses via the oral route with comparable systemic estrogenic potency, conjugated estrogens have about 1.3 to 4.5 times the hepatotropic potency (i.e., potency in modulating liver protein synthesis) of estradiol, ethinylestradiol has about 2.9 to 5.0 times the hepatotropic potency of estradiol, and diethylstilbestrol shows about 5.7 to 7.5 times the hepatotropic potency of estradiol (all measured via a small selection of estrogen-modulated hepatic proteins that included HDL cholesterol, SHBG, CBG, and angiotensinogen). The greater hepatotropic potency of these estrogens relative to estradiol is related to susceptibility to hepatic metabolism. Whereas estradiol is metabolized and thereby inactivated rapidly upon entry into the liver, other estrogens like ethinylestradiol and diethylstilbestrol are resistant to hepatic metabolism and persist in the liver for a longer amount of time. This is reflected in the biological half-lives of these estrogens; the blood half-life of estradiol is about 1 to 2 hours, while the half-lives of ethinylestradiol and diethylstilbestrol are approximately 20 hours and 24 hours, respectively. In accordance with its long half-life, ethinylestradiol passes through the liver many times prior to its elimination. Because humans are not adapted to efficiently metabolize conjugated estrogens (which are equine (horse) estrogens) and synthetic estrogens like ethinylestradiol and diethylstilbestrol, these estrogens are not properly inactivated in the liver, with markedly disproportionate hepatic estrogenic effects resulting.

In addition to differences in hepatotropic potency between estradiol and other estrogens, there are differences in hepatotropic potency between different routes of administration of estradiol. Due to the first pass through the liver, oral estradiol results in disproportionate and unphysiological hepatic estradiol levels that are 4- to 5-fold higher than in the circulation. Conversely, parenteral routes of estradiol, such as transdermal, vaginal, and injection, bypass the first pass through the liver and produce levels of estradiol in the circulation and liver that are comparable. As an example of the reduced hepatic impact of parenteral estradiol relative to oral estradiol, a study found that 1 mg/day oral estradiol significantly increased SHBG levels by 45%, while 50 μg/day transdermal estradiol increased SHBG levels non-significantly by only 12% (with these dosages being roughly equivalent in systemic estrogenic potency). As such, not only do oral non-bioidentical estrogens like ethinylestradiol and conjugated estrogens have substantially greater potency in the liver than does oral estradiol, oral estradiol has considerably greater potency in the liver than does parenteral estradiol. Thus, the hepatotropic effects of oral non-bioidentical estrogens like ethinylestradiol are massive in comparison to parenteral estradiol (see the graph above/to the right), which in contrast to these estrogens has very weak or even absent effects on liver protein synthesis at normal therapeutic dosages. Whereas high-dosage 320 mg/month intramuscular polyestradiol phosphate increased SHBG levels to 166% in men with prostate cancer, the combination of 80 mg/month intramuscular polyestradiol phosphate and high-dosage 150 μg/day oral ethinylestradiol increased levels of SHBG to 617%, an almost 8-fold difference in increase and almost 4-fold difference in absolute levels between the two treatment regimens.

The effects of estrogens on liver protein synthesis, such as on the synthesis of coagulation factors, lipoproteins, and triglycerides, can cause an increased risk of thromboembolic and cardiovascular complications, which in turn can result in increased mortality. The risk of thromboembolic and cardiovascular complications is significantly increased in postmenopausal women taking oral conjugated estrogens as a component of menopausal hormone therapy. Both oral estradiol and oral esterified estrogens have been found to have a significantly lower risk of thromboembolic and cardiovascular complications than oral conjugated estrogens, and transdermal estradiol appears to have no such risks at all. Widely employed in the past, oral synthetic estrogens like ethinylestradiol and diethylstilbestrol are no longer used in menopausal hormone therapy due to their high risks of thromboembolic and cardiovascular complications. Studies have found a markedly increased 5-year risk of cardiovascular mortality of 14 to 26% in men treated with high-dosage oral synthetic estrogens like ethinylestradiol and diethylstilbestrol for prostate cancer. With diethylstilbestrol, there is an up to 35% incidence of cardiovascular toxicity and an up to 15% incidence of venous thromboembolism. In a small study comparing high-dosage 320 mg/month intramuscular polyestradiol phosphate versus the combination of 80 mg/month polyestradiol phosphate with high-dosage 150 μg/day oral ethinylestradiol for prostate cancer, there was a 25% incidence of cardiovascular complications over the course of a year in the group that was also treated with ethinylestradiol, whereas there were no cardiovascular complications in the polyestradiol phosphate-only group. In accordance, another study found no change in levels of coagulation factor VII, a protein of particular importance in the cardiovascular side effects of estrogens, with 240 mg/month intramuscular polyestradiol phosphate. In spite of the markedly reduced impact of parenteral estradiol on the liver compared to other estrogens however, high dosages of parenteral estradiol, producing high levels of circulating estradiol, can still result in important and undesirable changes in liver protein synthesis as with other estrogens. A high dosage of 320 mg/month polyestradiol phosphate has been found to result in significantly increased cardiovascular morbidity (due to non-fatal ischemic heart events and heart decompensation) in men with prostate cancer in two large studies, though cardiovascular mortality was notably not increased.

In addition to the liver, ethinylestradiol shows disproportionate estrogenic effects in the uterus. This is due to its inability to be inactivated by uterine 17β-hydroxysteroid dehydrogenase (17β-HSD). Because of its disproportionate effects in the uterus, ethinylestradiol is associated with a significantly lower incidence of vaginal bleeding and spotting than is estradiol, particularly in combination with progestogens (which induce 17β-HSD expression and hence estradiol metabolism in the uterus), and is an important contributing factor in why ethinylestradiol, among other reasons and in spite of its inferior safety profile, has been widely used in oral contraceptives instead of estradiol. Although ethinylestradiol has increased effects in the uterus relative to estradiol, it is similarly not associated with an increase in the risk of endometrial hyperplasia and endometrial cancer when used in combination with a progestogen, but instead with a significant decrease.

== See also ==
- Pharmacokinetics of estradiol
- Pharmacodynamics of progesterone
- Pharmacokinetics of progesterone
