= Progestin and adipoQ receptor =

Group of receptors

The progestin and adipoQ receptor (PAQR) family is a group of receptors related to but distinct from the G protein-coupled receptor family, which have the similar seven transmembrane structure, but the N-terminal is located on the inner side of the cell. It includes at least 11 receptors (PAQR1–PAQR11), including the adiponectin (adipoQ) receptors (AdipoRs), the membrane progesterone receptors (mPRs), and others.

In 2016, the University of Tokyo announced that it would launch an investigation into claims of fabrication of AdipoRs identification data, as accused by an anonymous person/group called Ordinary_researchers.

== List of PAQRs ==
=== AdipoRs ===
- PAQR1 (AdipoR1)
- PAQR2 (AdipoR2)

=== mPRs ===
- PAQR5 (mPRγ)
- PAQR6 (mPRδ)
- PAQR7 (mPRα)
- PAQR8 (mPRβ)
- PAQR9 (mPRϵ)

=== Others ===
- PAQR3
- PAQR4
- PAQR10
- PAQR11
