= PAQR9 =

Protein-coding gene in the species Homo sapiens

Identifiers
- Aliases: PAQR9, progestin and adipoQ receptor family member 9, BLNC1
- External IDs: OMIM: 614580; MGI: 1922802; GeneCards: PAQR9

Gene location (Human)
Chr.	Chromosome 3 (human)
Band	3q23	Start	142,949,164 bp
Band	3q23	End	142,963,674 bp

Gene location (Mouse)
Chr.	Chromosome 9 (mouse)
Band	9|9 E3.3	Start	95,559,657 bp
Band	9|9 E3.3	End	95,568,023 bp
RNA expression pattern
Bgee	Human / Mouse (ortholog); Top expressed in: sperm; liver; right lobe of liver; right testis; left testis; testicle; retinal pigment epithelium; biceps brachii; left ventricle; myocardium / Top expressed in: left lobe of liver; blood; retinal pigment epithelium; interventricular septum; trigeminal ganglion; epithelium of small intestine; human kidney; Epithelium of choroid plexus; sexually immature organism; subcutaneous adipose tissue; More reference expression data
BioGPS	n/a
Gene ontology
Molecular function	steroid hormone receptor activity; steroid binding; lipid binding; signaling receptor activity
Cellular component	integral component of membrane; membrane; plasma membrane
Biological process	response to steroid hormone; steroid hormone mediated signaling pathway
Sources:Amigo / QuickGO
Orthologs
Databases	NCBI: entry; OMA: entry
Species	Human	Mouse
Entrez	344838	75552
Ensembl	ENSG00000188582	ENSMUSG00000064225
UniProt	Q6ZVX9	Q6TCG2
RefSeq (mRNA)	NM_198504; NM_001375300; NM_001375301	NM_198414
RefSeq (protein)	NP_940906; NP_001362229; NP_001362230	NP_940806
Location (UCSC)	Chr 3: 142.95 – 142.96 Mb	Chr 9: 95.56 – 95.57 Mb
PubMed search
- Wikidata
View/Edit Human	View/Edit Mouse

Membrane progesterone receptor epsilon (mPRɛ), or progestin and adipoQ receptor 9 (PAQR9), is a protein that in humans is encoded by the PAQR9 gene.

== See also ==
- Membrane progesterone receptor
- Progestin and adipoQ receptor
