= PAQR5 =

Protein-coding gene in the species Homo sapiens

Identifiers
- Aliases: PAQR5, MPRG, progestin and adipoQ receptor family member 5
- External IDs: OMIM: 607781; MGI: 1921340; GeneCards: PAQR5

Gene location (Human)
Chr.	Chromosome 15 (human)
Band	15q23	Start	69,298,912 bp
Band	15q23	End	69,407,780 bp

Gene location (Mouse)
Chr.	Chromosome 9 (mouse)
Band	9|9 B	Start	61,860,763 bp
Band	9|9 B	End	61,934,138 bp
RNA expression pattern
Bgee	Human / Mouse (ortholog); Top expressed in: rectum; right adrenal gland; left adrenal cortex; right adrenal cortex; mucosa of transverse colon; human kidney; islet of Langerhans; epithelium of colon; body of pancreas; upper lobe of left lung / Top expressed in: transitional epithelium of urinary bladder; right kidney; lumbar spinal ganglion; seminiferous tubule; esophagus; epithelium of stomach; human kidney; proximal tubule; ascending aorta; lip; More reference expression data
BioGPS	n/a
Gene ontology
Molecular function	steroid hormone receptor activity; steroid binding; protein binding; lipid binding; signaling receptor activity
Cellular component	integral component of membrane; membrane; plasma membrane
Biological process	multicellular organism development; response to steroid hormone; cell differentiation; oogenesis; steroid hormone mediated signaling pathway
Sources:Amigo / QuickGO
Orthologs
Databases	NCBI: entry; OMA: entry
Species	Human	Mouse
Entrez	54852	74090
Ensembl	ENSG00000137819	ENSMUSG00000032278
UniProt	Q9NXK6	Q9DCU0
RefSeq (mRNA)	NM_001104554; NM_017705	NM_028748
RefSeq (protein)	NP_001098024; NP_060175	NP_083024
Location (UCSC)	Chr 15: 69.3 – 69.41 Mb	Chr 9: 61.86 – 61.93 Mb
PubMed search
- Wikidata
View/Edit Human	View/Edit Mouse

Membrane progesterone receptor gamma (mPRγ), or progestin and adipoQ receptor 5 (PAQR5), is a protein that in humans is encoded by the PAQR5 gene.

== See also ==
- Membrane progesterone receptor
- Progestin and adipoQ receptor
