= PAQR8 =

Protein-coding gene in the species Homo sapiens

Identifiers
- Aliases: PAQR8, C6orf33, LMPB1, MPRB, progestin and adipoQ receptor family member 8
- External IDs: OMIM: 607780; MGI: 1921479; GeneCards: PAQR8

Gene location (Human)
| Chr. | Chromosome 6 (human) |
| Band | 6p12.2 | Start | 52,361,421 bp |
| Band | 6p12.2 | End | 52,407,777 bp |

Gene location (Mouse)
| Chr. | Chromosome 1 (mouse) |
| Band | 1|1 A4 | Start | 20,960,830 bp |
| Band | 1|1 A4 | End | 21,009,874 bp |
RNA expression pattern
| Bgee | Human / Mouse (ortholog); Top expressed in: inferior ganglion of vagus nerve; globus pallidus; internal globus pallidus; subthalamic nucleus; external globus pallidus; medulla oblongata; pars reticulata; spinal cord; C1 segment; mucosa of ileum / Top expressed in: deep cerebellar nuclei; lateral geniculate nucleus; cerebellar vermis; suprachiasmatic nucleus; substantia nigra; lobe of cerebellum; pontine nuclei; mammillary body; medial geniculate nucleus; medial vestibular nucleus; More reference expression data |
| BioGPS | n/a |
Gene ontology
| Molecular function | steroid hormone receptor activity; steroid binding; lipid binding; signaling receptor activity |
| Cellular component | integral component of membrane; membrane; Golgi apparatus; plasma membrane |
| Biological process | multicellular organism development; response to steroid hormone; cell differentiation; oogenesis; steroid hormone mediated signaling pathway |
Sources:Amigo / QuickGO
Orthologs
| Databases | NCBI: entry; OMA: entry |
| Species | Human | Mouse |
| Entrez | 85315 | 74229 |
| Ensembl | ENSG00000170915 | ENSMUSG00000025931 |
| UniProt | Q8TEZ7 | Q80ZE5 |
| RefSeq (mRNA) | NM_133367 | NM_028829; NM_001355122 |
| RefSeq (protein) | NP_588608 | NP_083105; NP_001342051 |
| Location (UCSC) | Chr 6: 52.36 – 52.41 Mb | Chr 1: 20.96 – 21.01 Mb |
| PubMed search |
- Wikidata
| View/Edit Human | View/Edit Mouse |

Membrane progesterone receptor beta (mPRβ), or progestin and adipoQ receptor 8 (PAQR8), is a protein that in humans is encoded by the PAQR8 gene.

== See also ==
- Membrane progesterone receptor
- Progestin and adipoQ receptor
