= PAQR7 =

Protein found in humans

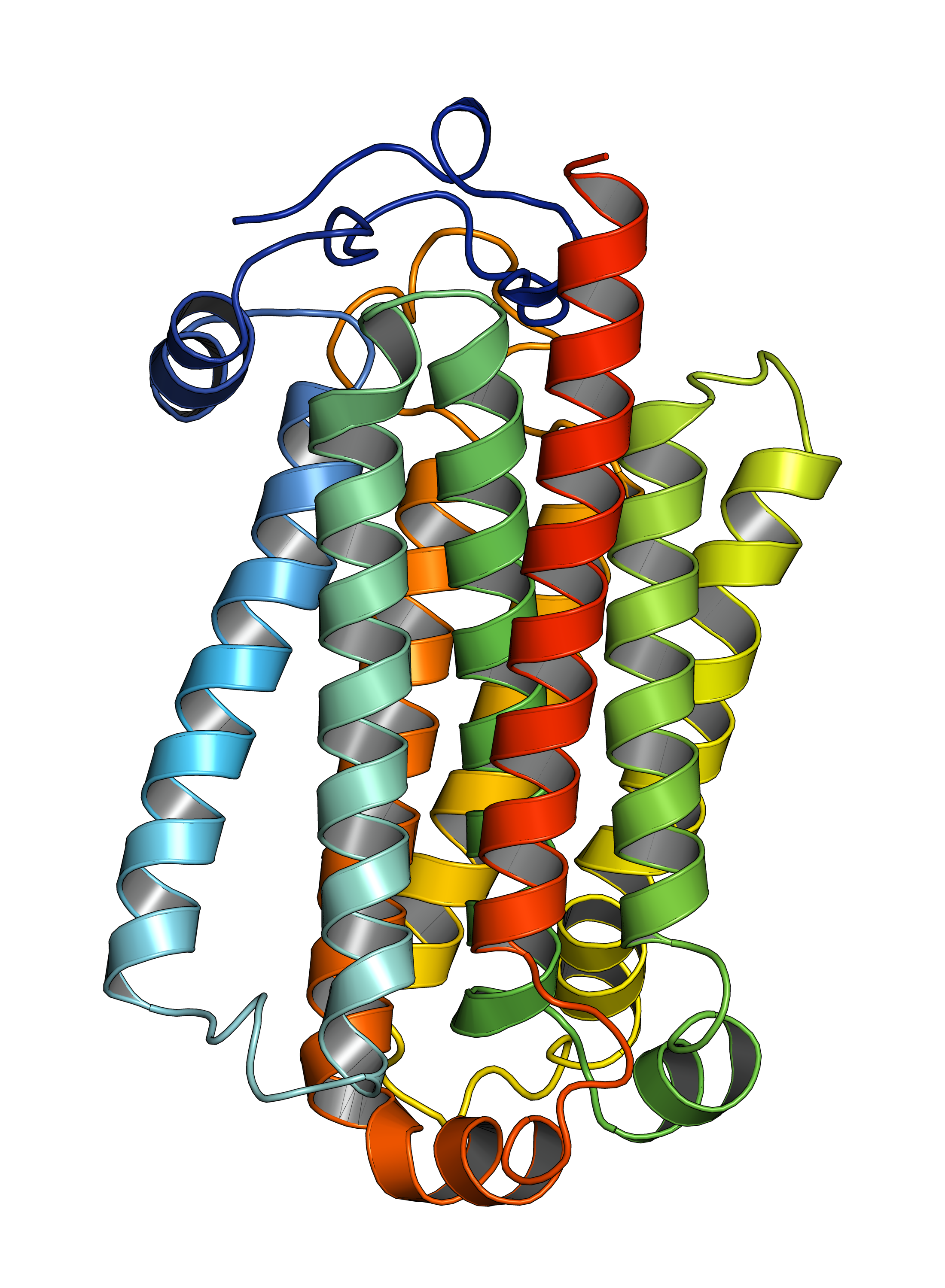

Identifiers
- Aliases: PAQR7, MPRA, PGLP, mSR, progestin and adipoQ receptor family member 7
- External IDs: OMIM: 607779; MGI: 1919154; GeneCards: PAQR7

Gene location (Human)
Chr.	Chromosome 1 (human)
Band	1p36.11	Start	25,861,484 bp
Band	1p36.11	End	25,875,708 bp

Gene location (Mouse)
Chr.	Chromosome 4 (mouse)
Band	4|4 D2.3	Start	134,224,008 bp
Band	4|4 D2.3	End	134,237,546 bp
RNA expression pattern
Bgee	Human / Mouse (ortholog); Top expressed in: tendon of biceps brachii; right testis; left testis; skin of arm; buccal mucosa cell; right uterine tube; right adrenal cortex; right ovary; left adrenal gland; left ovary / Top expressed in: skin of external ear; right kidney; perirhinal cortex; entorhinal cortex; granulocyte; transitional epithelium of urinary bladder; lip; CA3 field; anterior horn of spinal cord; cumulus cell; More reference expression data
BioGPS	n/a
Gene ontology
Molecular function	steroid hormone receptor activity; steroid binding; lipid binding; signaling receptor activity
Cellular component	integral component of membrane; plasma membrane; membrane
Biological process	multicellular organism development; response to steroid hormone; cell differentiation; oogenesis; steroid hormone mediated signaling pathway
Sources:Amigo / QuickGO
Orthologs
Databases	NCBI: entry; OMA: entry
Species	Human	Mouse
Entrez	164091	71904
Ensembl	ENSG00000182749	ENSMUSG00000037348
UniProt	Q86WK9	Q80ZE4
RefSeq (mRNA)	NM_178422	NM_001285845; NM_001285846; NM_001285847; NM_001285849; NM_027995
RefSeq (protein)	NP_848509	NP_001272774; NP_001272775; NP_001272776; NP_001272778; NP_082271
Location (UCSC)	Chr 1: 25.86 – 25.88 Mb	Chr 4: 134.22 – 134.24 Mb
PubMed search
- Wikidata
View/Edit Human	View/Edit Mouse

Membrane progesterone receptor alpha (mPRα), or progestin and adipoQ receptor 7 (PAQR7), is a protein that in humans is encoded by the PAQR7 gene.

== See also ==
- Membrane progesterone receptor
- Progestin and adipoQ receptor
