= PAQR6 =

Protein found in humans

Identifiers
- Aliases: PAQR6, PRdelta, progestin and adipoQ receptor family member 6
- External IDs: OMIM: 614579; MGI: 1916207; GeneCards: PAQR6

Gene location (Human)
| Chr. | Chromosome 1 (human) |
| Band | 1q22 | Start | 156,243,320 bp |
| Band | 1q22 | End | 156,248,117 bp |

Gene location (Mouse)
| Chr. | Chromosome 3 (mouse) |
| Band | 3|3 F1 | Start | 88,271,891 bp |
| Band | 3|3 F1 | End | 88,275,848 bp |
RNA expression pattern
| Bgee | Human / Mouse (ortholog); Top expressed in: C1 segment; dorsal motor nucleus of vagus nerve; inferior olivary nucleus; optic nerve; internal globus pallidus; substantia nigra; hypothalamus; inferior ganglion of vagus nerve; amygdala; anterior cingulate cortex / Top expressed in: hypothalamus; olfactory bulb; urinary bladder; cerebellum; cerebellar cortex; primary oocyte; striatum of neuraxis; urethra; secondary oocyte; esophagus; More reference expression data |
| BioGPS | n/a |
Gene ontology
| Molecular function | steroid hormone receptor activity; steroid binding; lipid binding; signaling receptor activity |
| Cellular component | integral component of membrane; membrane; plasma membrane |
| Biological process | response to steroid hormone; steroid hormone mediated signaling pathway |
Sources:Amigo / QuickGO
Orthologs
| Databases | NCBI: entry; OMA: entry |
| Species | Human | Mouse |
| Entrez | 79957 | 68957 |
| Ensembl | ENSG00000160781 | ENSMUSG00000041423 |
| UniProt | Q6TCH4 | Q6TCG5 |
| RefSeq (mRNA) | NM_001272104; NM_001272105; NM_001272106; NM_001272107; NM_001272108 NM_001272109; NM_001272110; NM_001272111; NM_001272112; NM_001272113; NM_024897; NM_198406 | NM_198410; NM_001310597 |
| RefSeq (protein) | NP_001259033; NP_001259034; NP_001259035; NP_001259036; NP_001259037 NP_001259038; NP_001259039; NP_001259040; NP_001259041; NP_001259042; NP_079173; NP_940798; NP_001259036.1 | NP_001297526; NP_940802; NP_001391037; NP_001391038; NP_001391039 |
| Location (UCSC) | Chr 1: 156.24 – 156.25 Mb | Chr 3: 88.27 – 88.28 Mb |
| PubMed search |
- Wikidata
| View/Edit Human | View/Edit Mouse |

Membrane progesterone receptor delta (mPRδ), or progestin and adipoQ receptor 6 (PAQR6), is a protein that in humans is encoded by the PAQR6 gene.

== See also ==
- Membrane progesterone receptor
- Progestin and adipoQ receptor
