= C7H6O3 =

The molecular formula C_{7}H_{6}O_{3} may refer to:

- Dihydroxybenzaldehydes
  - 2,4-Dihydroxybenzaldehyde
  - 3,4-Dihydroxybenzaldehyde
- Monohydroxybenzoic acids
  - 2-Hydroxybenzoic acid (salicylic acid)
  - 3-Hydroxybenzoic acid
  - 4-Hydroxybenzoic acid
- Peroxybenzoic acid
- Sesamol
