= C21H25NO5 =

The molecular formula C_{21}H_{25}NO_{5} may refer to:

- Demecolcine, a drug used in chemotherapy
- Diacetyldihydromorphine, an opioid analgesic
- MIBE, a nonsteroidal antiestrogen
- MR-2096, an opioid analgesic
