= 4-hydroxymandelate oxidase =

Class of enzymes

Identifiers
- EC no.: 1.1.3.19
- CAS no.: 60976-30-9

Databases
- BRENDA: enzyme data
- ExPASy: NiceZyme view
- KEGG: enzyme entry
- MetaCyc: metabolic pathway
- Rhea: reactions
- PDB structures: RCSB PDB PDBe PDBsum
- Gene Ontology: AmiGO / QuickGO
Search
- PMC: articles
- PubMed: articles
- NCBI: proteins

In enzymology, 4-hydroxymandelate oxidase (EC 1.1.3.19) is an enzyme that catalyzes the chemical reaction

(S)-4-Hydroxymandelic acid
O_{2}
H_{2}O_{2}
O_{2}
H_{2}O_{2}
4-Hydroxybenzaldehyde
+ CO_{2}

The two substrates of this enzyme are (S)-4-Hydroxymandelic acid and oxygen. Its products are 4-hydroxybenzaldehyde, carbon dioxide, and hydrogen peroxide.

This enzyme belongs to the family of oxidoreductases, specifically those acting on the CH-OH group of donor with oxygen as acceptor. The systematic name of this enzyme class is (S)-2-hydroxy-2-(4-hydroxyphenyl)acetate:oxygen 1-oxidoreductase. This enzyme is also called L-4-hydroxymandelate oxidase (decarboxylating). It has 2 cofactors: FAD, and Manganese.
