= 4-Cresol dehydrogenase (hydroxylating) =

Class of enzymes

4-cresol dehydrogenase (hydroxylating)

Identifiers
- EC no.: 1.17.99.1
- CAS no.: 66772-07-4

Databases
- BRENDA: enzyme data
- ExPASy: NiceZyme view
- KEGG: enzyme entry
- MetaCyc: metabolic pathway
- Rhea: reactions
- PDB structures: RCSB PDB PDBe PDBsum
- Gene Ontology: AmiGO / QuickGO
Search
- PMC: articles
- PubMed: articles
- NCBI: proteins

In enzymology, a 4-cresol dehydrogenase (hydroxylating) (EC 1.17.99.1) is an enzyme that catalyzes the chemical reaction

4-cresol + acceptor + H_{2}O $\rightleftharpoons$ 4-hydroxybenzaldehyde + reduced acceptor

The 3 substrates of this enzyme are 4-cresol, acceptor, and H_{2}O, whereas its two products are 4-hydroxybenzaldehyde and reduced acceptor.

This enzyme belongs to the family of oxidoreductases, specifically those acting on CH or CH_{2} groups with other acceptors. The systematic name of this enzyme class is 4-cresol:acceptor oxidoreductase (methyl-hydroxylating). Other names in common use include p-cresol–(acceptor) oxidoreductase (hydroxylating), and p-cresol methylhydroxylase. This enzyme participates in toluene and xylene degradation. It has 2 cofactors: FAD, and Cytochrome c.

== Structural studies ==
As of late 2007, 4 structures have been solved for this class of enzymes, with PDB accession codes PDB: 1DII, PDB: 1DIQ, PDB: 1WVE, and PDB: 1WVF.
