= Salicylaldehyde =

Salicylic aldehyde
Skeletal formula
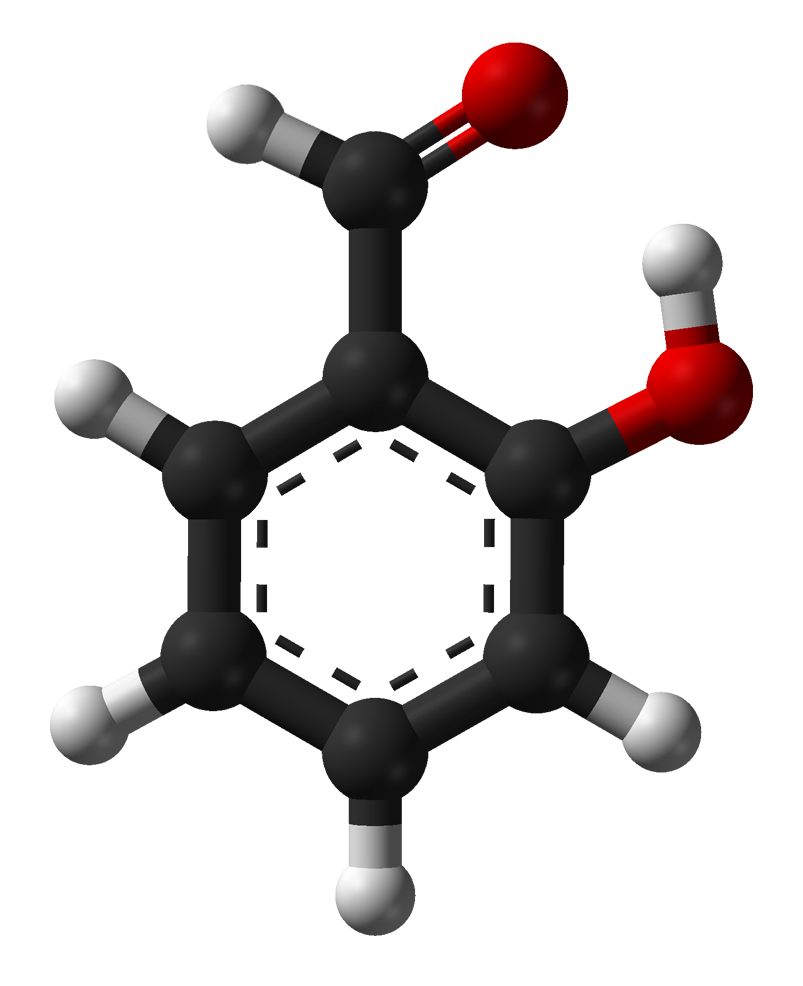
Ball-and-stick model

Names
- Preferred IUPAC name 2-Hydroxybenzaldehyde
- Other names Salicylaldehyde; Salicylic aldehyde o-Hydroxybenzaldehyde

Identifiers
CAS Number	90-02-8
3D model (JSmol)	Interactive image
Beilstein Reference	471388
ChEBI	CHEBI:16008
ChEMBL	ChEMBL108925
ChemSpider	13863618
ECHA InfoCard	100.001.783
EC Number	201-961-0
Gmelin Reference	3273
KEGG	C06202
PubChem CID	6998
UNII	17K64GZH20
CompTox Dashboard (EPA)	DTXSID1021792
- InChI: InChI=1S/C7H6O2/c8-5-6-3-1-2-4-7(6)9/h1-5,9H Key: SMQUZDBALVYZAC-UHFFFAOYSA-N; InChI=1/C7H6O2/c8-5-6-3-1-2-4-7(6)9/h1-5,9H Key: SMQUZDBALVYZAC-UHFFFAOYAD
- SMILES: O=Cc1ccccc1O

Properties
Chemical formula	C_{7}H_{6}O_{2}
Molar mass	122.123 g·mol^{−1}
Density	1.146 g/cm^{3}
Melting point	−7 °C (19 °F; 266 K)
Boiling point	196 to 197 °C (385 to 387 °F; 469 to 470 K)
Magnetic susceptibility (χ)	−64.4·10^{−6} cm^{3}/mol

Hazards
- GHS labelling
Pictograms	(GHS07: Exclamation mark) (GHS09: Environmental hazard)
Signal word	Warning
Hazard statements	H302, H315, H317, H319, H335, H411
Precautionary statements	P280, P305+P351+P338
- Safety data sheet (SDS)

Related compounds
Related compounds	Salicylic acid Benzaldehyde; Salicylaldoxime
- Except where otherwise noted, data are given for materials in their standard state (at 25 °C [77 °F], 100 kPa). verify (what is ?) Infobox references

Salicylic aldehyde (2-hydroxybenzaldehyde) is an organic compound with the formula C_{6}H_{4}OH(CHO). Along with 3-hydroxybenzaldehyde and 4-hydroxybenzaldehyde, it is one of the three isomers of hydroxybenzaldehyde. It is a colorless oily liquid, with a bitter almond odor at higher concentration. Salicylaldehyde is a precursor to coumarin and a variety of chelating agents.

== Production ==
Salicylaldehyde is produced by condensation of phenol with formaldehyde to give hydroxybenzyl alcohol, which is oxidized to the aldehyde. Salicylaldehydes in general are prepared by ortho-selective formylation reactions from the corresponding phenol, for instance by the Duff reaction, Reimer–Tiemann reaction, or by treatment with paraformaldehyde in the presence of magnesium chloride and a base.

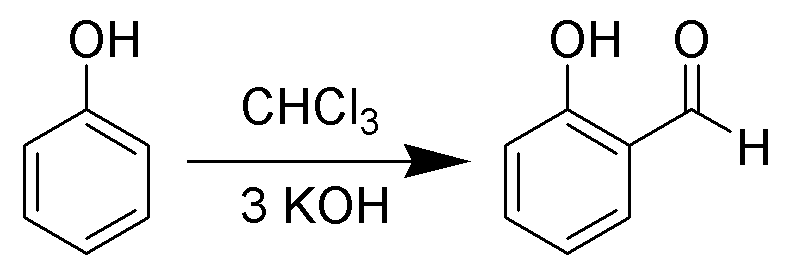

== Natural occurrences ==
Salicylaldehyde is a characteristic aroma component of buckwheat. Salicylaldehyde also occurs in the larval defensive secretions of several leaf beetle species that belong the subtribe Chrysomelina. An example for a leaf beetle species that produces salicylaldehyde is the red poplar leaf beetle Chrysomela populi.

== Reactions and applications ==
Salicylaldehyde is mainly used commercially as a precursor to coumarin. The conversion entails condensation with acetic anhydride ("Perkin synthesis").

Catechol, benzofuran, a salicylaldehydimine (R = alkyl or aryl), 3-carbethoxycoumarin

1. Oxidation with hydrogen peroxide gives catechol (1,2-dihydroxybenzene) (Dakin reaction).
2. Etherification with chloroacetic acid followed by cyclisation gives the heterocycle benzofuran (coumarone). The first step in this reaction to the substituted benzofuran is called the Rap–Stoermer condensation after E. Rap (1895) and R. Stoermer (1900).
3. Salicylaldehyde is converted to chelating ligands by condensation with amines. With ethylenediamine, it condenses to give the ligand salen. Hydroxylamine gives salicylaldoxime.
4. Condensation with diethyl malonate gives 3-carbethoxycoumarin (a derivative of coumarin) by an aldol condensation.

Elbs persulfate oxidation gives gentisaldehyde (2,5-dihydroxybenzaldehyde).

== Internal hydrogen bonding ==
Due to the ortho positioning of the hydroxy- and aldehyde groups, an internal hydrogen bond is formed between the groups. The hydroxy group serves here as the hydrogen bond donor, and the aldehyde as hydrogen bond acceptor. This internal hydrogen is not found in the other hydroxybenzaldehyde isomers. When the aldehyde is reacted with an amine to form an imine, the internal hydrogen bond is even stronger. In addition, tautomerisation, which is especially prevalent in polar solvents, can further increase the stability of the compound. The internal hydrogen bond also ensures that the aldehyde (or corresponding imine) is held into the same plane, making the whole molecule essentially flat.
