= 3-Hydroxybenzaldehyde =

Names
- Preferred IUPAC name 3-Hydroxybenzaldehyde
- Other names m-Hydroxybenzaldehyde; m-Formylphenol; 3-formylphenol

Identifiers
CAS Number	100-83-4
3D model (JSmol)	Interactive image
ChEBI	CHEBI:16207
ChEMBL	ChEMBL243816
ChemSpider	21105795
ECHA InfoCard	100.002.630
KEGG	C03067
PubChem CID	101
UNII	8Z2819J40E
CompTox Dashboard (EPA)	DTXSID7059220
- InChI: InChI=1S/C7H6O2/c8-5-6-2-1-3-7(9)4-6/h1-5,9H Key: IAVREABSGIHHMO-UHFFFAOYSA-N; InChI=1/C7H6O2/c8-5-6-2-1-3-7(9)4-6/h1-5,9H Key: IAVREABSGIHHMO-UHFFFAOYAC
- SMILES: O=Cc1cc(O)ccc1

Properties
Chemical formula	C_{7}H_{6}O_{2}
Molar mass	122.123 g·mol^{−1}
Appearance	colorless solid
Density	1.1179 g/cm^{3} (130 °C)
Melting point	106 °C (223 °F; 379 K)
Boiling point	240 °C (464 °F; 513 K)
Acidity (pK_{a})	8.98 (25 °C)
- Except where otherwise noted, data are given for materials in their standard state (at 25 °C [77 °F], 100 kPa). Infobox references

3-Hydroxybenzaldehyde is an organic compound with the formula HOC_{6}H_{4}CHO. It is a colorless solid although most samples appear tan. Two other isomers of hydroxybenzaldehyde exist.

== Preparation ==
It has been prepared from 3-nitrobenzaldehyde in a sequence of nitro group reduction, diazotization of the amine, and hydrolysis.

3-hydroxybenzyl-alcohol dehydrogenase is an nicotinamide adenine dinucleotide phosphate-dependent enzyme that produces 3-hydroxybenzaldehyde from 3-hydroxybenzyl alcohol.

3-hydroxybenzyl alcohol
+ NADP^{+}
H^{+}
H^{+}
3-hydroxybenzaldehyde
+ NADPH

== Biomedical properties ==
3-Hydroxybenzaldehyde exhibits vasculoprotective effects by lowering vascular smooth muscle cell proliferation and endothelial cells inflammation. 3-Hydroxybenzaldehyde is used in the synthesis of monastrol.

== See also ==
- Salicylaldehyde (2-hydroxybenzaldehyde)
- 4-Hydroxybenzaldehyde

== Cited sources ==
- Haynes, William M., ed. (2016). CRC Handbook of Chemistry and Physics (97th ed.). CRC Press. ISBN 978-1-4987-5429-3.
