= ERx =

ERx is a putative membrane estrogen receptor (mER) of which little is currently known. It was discovered as a gene transcription signature induced by estradiol that is independent of the ERα/ERβ and GPER and was identified using the membrane-impermeable estradiol conjugate E2-BSA in the absence or presence of the ERα/ERβ antagonist fulvestrant (ICI-182,780) and the GPER antagonist G-15.

== See also ==
- ER-X
- GPER (GPR30)
- G_{q}-mER
- Estrogen receptor
