= Estradiol =

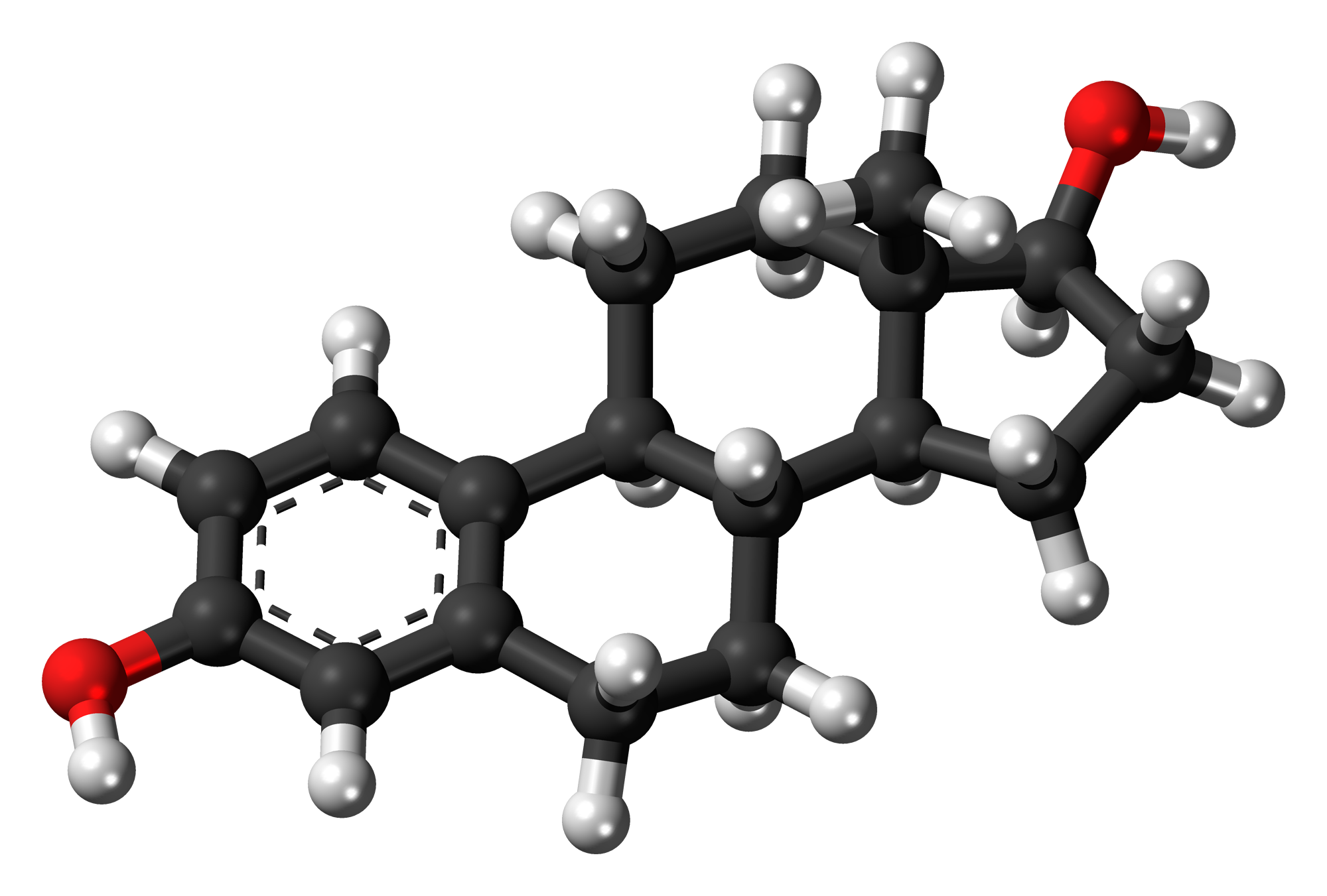

Names
Pronunciation	/ˌɛstrəˈdaɪoʊl/ ES-trə-DY-ohl
- IUPAC name Estra-1,3,5(10)-triene-3,17β-diol
- Systematic IUPAC name (1S,3aS,3bR,9bS,11aS)-11a-Methyl-2,3,3a,3b,4,5,9b,10,11,11a-decahydro-1H-cyclopenta[a]phenanthrene-1,7-diol
- Other names Oestradiol; E2; 17β-Estradiol; 17β-Oestradiol

Identifiers
CAS Number	50-28-2
3D model (JSmol)	Interactive image
ChEBI	CHEBI:16469
ChEMBL	ChEMBL135
ChemSpider	5554
DrugBank	DB00783
ECHA InfoCard	100.000.022
EC Number	200-023-8
KEGG	D00105
PubChem CID	5757
UNII	4TI98Z838E
CompTox Dashboard (EPA)	DTXSID0020573
- InChI: InChI=1S/C18H24O2/c1-18-9-8-14-13-5-3-12(19)10-11(13)2-4-15(14)16(18)6-7-17(18)20/h3,5,10,14-17,19-20H,2,4,6-9H2,1H3/t14-,15-,16+,17+,18+/m1/s1 Key: VOXZDWNPVJITMN-ZBRFXRBCSA-N
- SMILES: Oc1ccc2[C@H]3CC[C@]4(C)[C@@H]5(CC[C@H]4[C@@H]3CCc2c1).O5

Properties
Chemical formula	C_{18}H_{24}O_{2}
Molar mass	272.38 g/mol
Magnetic susceptibility (χ)	−186.6·10^{−6} cm^{3}/mol

Pharmacology
ATC code	G03CA03 (WHO)
License data	EU EMA: by INN
Routes of administration	Oral, sublingual, intranasal, topical/transdermal, vaginal, intramuscular or subcutaneous (as an ester), subdermal implant
- Pharmacokinetics
Bioavailability	Oral: <5%
Protein binding	~98%: • Albumin: 60% • SHBG: 38% • Free: 2%
Metabolism	Liver (via hydroxylation, sulfation, glucuronidation)
Biological half-life	Oral: 13–20 hours Sublingual: 8–18 hours Topical (gel): 36.5 hours
Excretion	Urine: 54% Feces: 6%
- Except where otherwise noted, data are given for materials in their standard state (at 25 °C [77 °F], 100 kPa). verify (what is ?) Infobox references

Estradiol (E2), also called oestrogen, oestradiol, is an estrogen steroid hormone and the major female sex hormone. It is involved in the regulation of female reproductive cycles such as estrous and menstrual cycles. Estradiol is responsible for the development of female secondary sexual characteristics such as the breasts, widening of the hips and a female pattern of fat distribution. It is also important in the development and maintenance of female reproductive tissues such as the mammary glands, uterus and vagina during puberty, adulthood and pregnancy. It also has important effects in many other tissues including bone, fat, skin, liver, and the brain.

Though estradiol levels in males are much lower than in females, estradiol has important roles in males as well. Apart from humans and other mammals, estradiol is also found in most vertebrates and crustaceans, insects, fish, and other animal species.

Estradiol is produced within the follicles of the ovaries and in other tissues including the testicles, the adrenal glands, fat, liver, the breasts, and the brain. Estradiol is produced in the body from cholesterol through a series of reactions and intermediates. The major pathway involves the formation of androstenedione, which is then converted by aromatase into estrone and is subsequently converted into estradiol. Alternatively, androstenedione can be converted into testosterone, which can then be converted into estradiol. Upon menopause in females, production of estrogens by the ovaries stops and estradiol levels decrease to very low levels.

In addition to its role as a natural hormone, estradiol is used as a medication, for instance in menopausal hormone therapy, and feminizing hormone therapy for transgender women and some genderqueer individuals; for information on estradiol as a medication, see the estradiol (medication) article.

== Biological function ==
=== Sexual development ===
The development of secondary sex characteristics in women is driven by estrogens, to be specific, estradiol. These changes are initiated at the time of puberty, most are enhanced during the reproductive years, and become less pronounced with declining estradiol support after menopause. Thus, estradiol produces breast development, and is responsible for changes in the body shape, affecting bones, joints, and fat deposition. In females, estradiol induces breast development, widening of the hips, a feminine fat distribution (with fat deposited particularly in the breasts, hips, thighs, and buttocks), and maturation of the vagina and vulva, whereas it mediates the pubertal growth spurt (indirectly via increased growth hormone secretion) and epiphyseal closure (thereby limiting final height) in both sexes.

=== Reproduction ===
==== Female reproductive system ====
In the female, estradiol acts as a growth hormone for tissue of the reproductive organs, supporting the lining of the vagina, the cervical glands, the endometrium, and the lining of the fallopian tubes. It enhances growth of the myometrium. Estradiol appears necessary to maintain oocytes in the ovary. During the menstrual cycle, estradiol produced by the growing follicles triggers, via a positive feedback system, the hypothalamic-pituitary events that lead to the luteinizing hormone surge, inducing ovulation. In the luteal phase, estradiol, in conjunction with progesterone, prepares the endometrium for implantation. During pregnancy, estradiol increases due to placental production. The effect of estradiol, together with estrone and estriol, in pregnancy is less clear. They may promote uterine blood flow, myometrial growth, stimulate breast growth and at term, promote cervical softening and expression of myometrial oxytocin receptors. In baboons, blocking of estrogen production leads to pregnancy loss, suggesting estradiol has a role in the maintenance of pregnancy. Research is investigating the role of estrogens in the process of initiation of labor. Actions of estradiol are required before the exposure of progesterone in the luteal phase.

==== Male reproductive system ====
The effect of estradiol (and estrogens in general) upon male reproduction is complex. Estradiol is produced by action of aromatase mainly in the Leydig cells of the mammalian testis, but also by some germ cells and the Sertoli cells of immature mammals. It functions (in vitro) to prevent apoptosis of male sperm cells. While some studies in the early 1990s claimed a connection between globally declining sperm counts and estrogen exposure in the environment, later studies found no such connection, nor evidence of a general decline in sperm counts. Suppression of estradiol production in a subpopulation of subfertile men may improve the semen analysis.

Males with certain sex chromosome genetic conditions, such as Klinefelter's syndrome, will have a higher level of estradiol.

=== Skeletal system ===
Estradiol has a profound effect on bone. Individuals without it (or other estrogens) will become tall and eunuchoid, as epiphyseal closure is delayed or may not take place. Bone density is also affected, resulting in early osteopenia and osteoporosis. Low levels of estradiol may also predict fractures, with post-menopausal women having the highest incidence of bone fracture. Women past menopause experience an accelerated loss of bone mass due to a relative estrogen deficiency.

=== Skin health ===
The estrogen receptor, as well as the progesterone receptor, have been detected in the skin, including in keratinocytes and fibroblasts. At menopause and thereafter, decreased levels of female sex hormones result in atrophy, thinning, and increased wrinkling of the skin and a reduction in skin elasticity, firmness, and strength. These skin changes constitute an acceleration in skin aging and are the result of decreased collagen content, irregularities in the morphology of epidermal skin cells, decreased ground substance between skin fibers, and reduced capillaries and blood flow. The skin also becomes more dry during menopause, which is due to reduced skin hydration and surface lipids (sebum production). Along with chronological aging and photoaging, estrogen deficiency in menopause is one of the three main factors that predominantly influences skin aging.

Hormone replacement therapy consisting of systemic treatment with estrogen alone or in combination with a progestogen, has well-documented and considerable beneficial effects on the skin of postmenopausal women. These benefits include increased skin collagen content, skin thickness and elasticity, and skin hydration and surface lipids. Topical estrogen has been found to have similar beneficial effects on the skin. In addition, a study has found that topical 2% progesterone cream significantly increases skin elasticity and firmness and observably decreases wrinkles in peri- and postmenopausal women. Skin hydration and surface lipids, on the other hand, did not significantly change with topical progesterone. These findings suggest that progesterone, like estrogen, also has beneficial effects on the skin, and may be independently protective against skin aging.

=== Nervous system ===
Estrogens can be produced in the brain from steroid precursors. As antioxidants, they have been found to have neuroprotective function.

The positive and negative feedback loops of the menstrual cycle involve ovarian estradiol as the link to the hypothalamic-pituitary system to regulate gonadotropins.

Estrogen is considered to play a significant role in women's mental health, with links suggested between the hormone level, mood and well-being. Sudden drops or fluctuations in, or long periods of sustained low levels of estrogen may be correlated with significant mood-lowering. Clinical recovery from depression postpartum, perimenopause, and postmenopause was shown to be effective after levels of estrogen were stabilized and/or restored.

The volumes of sexually dimorphic brain structures in transgender women were found to change and approximate typical female brain structures when exposed to estrogen concomitantly with androgen deprivation over a period of months, suggesting that estrogen and/or androgens have a significant part to play in sex differentiation of the brain, both prenatally and later in life.

There is also evidence the programming of adult male sexual behavior in many vertebrates is largely dependent on estradiol produced during prenatal life and early infancy. It is not yet known whether this process plays a significant role in human sexual behavior, although evidence from other mammals tends to indicate a connection.

Estrogen has been found to increase the secretion of oxytocin and to increase the expression of its receptor, the oxytocin receptor, in the brain. In women, a single dose of ethinylestradiol has been found to be sufficient to increase circulating oxytocin concentrations.

=== Gynecological cancers ===
Estradiol has been tied to the development and progression of cancers such as breast cancer, ovarian cancer and endometrial cancer. Estradiol affects target tissues mainly by interacting with two nuclear receptors called estrogen receptor α (ERα) and estrogen receptor β (ERβ). One of the functions of these estrogen receptors is the modulation of gene expression. Once estradiol binds to the ERs, the receptor complexes then bind to specific DNA sequences, possibly causing damage to the DNA and an increase in cell division and DNA replication. Eukaryotic cells respond to damaged DNA by stimulating or impairing G1, S, or G2 phases of the cell cycle to initiate DNA repair. As a result, cellular transformation and cancer cell proliferation occurs.

=== Cardiovascular system ===
Estrogen affects certain blood vessels. Improvement in arterial blood flow has been demonstrated in coronary arteries. 17-beta-estradiol (E2) is considered the most potent estrogen found in humans. E2 influences vascular function, apoptosis, and damage during cardiac ischemia and reperfusion. E2 can protect the heart and individual cardiac myocytes from injuries related to ischemia. After a heart attack or long periods of hypertension, E2 inhibits the adverse effects of pathologic remodeling of the heart.

During pregnancy, high levels of estrogens, namely estradiol, increase coagulation and the risk of venous thromboembolism.

Absolute and relative incidence of venous thromboembolism (VTE) during pregnancy and the postpartum period
Absolute incidence of first VTE per 10,000 person–years during pregnancy and the postpartum period
	Swedish data A		Swedish data B		English data		Danish data	
Time period	N	Rate (95% CI)	N	Rate (95% CI)	NФВяы	Rate (95% CI)	N	Rate (95% CI)
Outside pregnancy	1105	4.2 (4.0–4.4)	1015	3.8 (?)	1480	3.2 (3.0–3.3)	2895	3.6 (3.4–3.7)
Antepartum	995	20.5 (19.2–21.8)	690	14.2 (13.2–15.3)	156	9.9 (8.5–11.6)	491	10.7 (9.7–11.6)
Trimester 1	207	13.6 (11.8–15.5)	172	11.3 (9.7–13.1)	23	4.6 (3.1–7.0)	61	4.1 (3.2–5.2)
Trimester 2	275	17.4 (15.4–19.6)	178	11.2 (9.7–13.0)	30	5.8 (4.1–8.3)	75	5.7 (4.6–7.2)
Trimester 3	513	29.2 (26.8–31.9)	340	19.4 (17.4–21.6)	103	18.2 (15.0–22.1)	355	19.7 (17.7–21.9)
Around delivery	115	154.6 (128.8–185.6)	79	106.1 (85.1–132.3)	34	142.8 (102.0–199.8)	–	
Postpartum	649	42.3 (39.2–45.7)	509	33.1 (30.4–36.1)	135	27.4 (23.1–32.4)	218	17.5 (15.3–20.0)
Early postpartum	584	75.4 (69.6–81.8)	460	59.3 (54.1–65.0)	177	46.8 (39.1–56.1)	199	30.4 (26.4–35.0)
Late postpartum	65	8.5 (7.0–10.9)	49	6.4 (4.9–8.5)	18	7.3 (4.6–11.6)	319	3.2 (1.9–5.0)
Incidence rate ratios (IRRs) of first VTE during pregnancy and the postpartum period
	Swedish data A		Swedish data B		English data		Danish data	
Time period	IRR* (95% CI)		IRR* (95% CI)		IRR (95% CI)†		IRR (95% CI)†	
Outside pregnancy	Reference (i.e., 1.00)							
Antepartum	5.08 (4.66–5.54)		3.80 (3.44–4.19)		3.10 (2.63–3.66)		2.95 (2.68–3.25)	
Trimester 1	3.42 (2.95–3.98)		3.04 (2.58–3.56)		1.46 (0.96–2.20)		1.12 (0.86–1.45)	
Trimester 2	4.31 (3.78–4.93)		3.01 (2.56–3.53)		1.82 (1.27–2.62)		1.58 (1.24–1.99)	
Trimester 3	7.14 (6.43–7.94)		5.12 (4.53–5.80)		5.69 (4.66–6.95)		5.48 (4.89–6.12)	
Around delivery	37.5 (30.9–44.45)		27.97 (22.24–35.17)		44.5 (31.68–62.54)		–	
Postpartum	10.21 (9.27–11.25)		8.72 (7.83–9.70)		8.54 (7.16–10.19)		4.85 (4.21–5.57)	
Early postpartum	19.27 (16.53–20.21)		15.62 (14.00–17.45)		14.61 (12.10–17.67)		8.44 (7.27–9.75)	
Late postpartum	2.06 (1.60–2.64)		1.69 (1.26–2.25)		2.29 (1.44–3.65)		0.89 (0.53–1.39)	
Notes: Swedish data A = Using any code for VTE regardless of confirmation. Swedish data B = Using only algorithm-confirmed VTE. Early postpartum = First 6 weeks after delivery. Late postpartum = More than 6 weeks after delivery. * = Adjusted for age and calendar year. † = Unadjusted ratio calculated based on the data provided. Source:

=== Other functions ===
Estradiol has been reported to exert a sex-specific protection from acute kidney injury in females. Hydroxlated metabolites (e.g., 2-hydroxyestradiol and 4-hydroxyestradiol) function as radical-trapping antioxidants (RTAs) and can prevent ferroptotic cell death in kidney tubules. Estrogen receptor α downregulates ETHE1, the catabolic enzyme for hydropersulfides, a class of metabolites that act as endogenous RTAs. Additionally, it suppresses the transcription of pro-ferroptotic ether-lipid pathway proteins that are more prominent in male tubules.

Estradiol also has complex effects on the liver. It affects the production of multiple proteins, including lipoproteins, binding proteins, and proteins responsible for blood clotting. In high amounts, estradiol can lead to cholestasis, for instance cholestasis of pregnancy.

Certain gynecological conditions are dependent on estrogen, such as endometriosis, leiomyomata uteri, and uterine bleeding.

== Biological activity ==
Estradiol acts primarily as an agonist of the estrogen receptor (ER), a nuclear steroid hormone receptor. There are two subtypes of the ER, ERα and ERβ, and estradiol potently binds to and activates both of these receptors. The result of ER activation is a modulation of gene transcription and expression in ER-expressing cells, which is the predominant mechanism by which estradiol mediates its biological effects in the body. Estradiol also acts as an agonist of membrane estrogen receptors (mERs), such as GPER (GPR30), a recently discovered non-nuclear receptor for estradiol, via which it can mediate a variety of rapid, non-genomic effects. Unlike the case of the ER, GPER appears to be selective for estradiol, and shows very low affinities for other endogenous estrogens, such as estrone and estriol. Additional mERs besides GPER include ER-X, ERx, and G_{q}-mER.

ERα/ERβ are in inactive state trapped in multimolecular chaperone complexes organized around the heat shock protein 90 (HSP90), containing p23 protein, and immunophilin, and located in majority in cytoplasm and partially in nucleus. In the E2 classical pathway or estrogen classical pathway, estradiol enters the cytoplasm, where it interacts with ERs. Once bound E2, ERs dissociate from the molecular chaperone complexes and become competent to dimerize, migrate to nucleus, and to bind to specific DNA sequences (estrogen response element, ERE), allowing for gene transcription which can take place over hours and days.

Given by subcutaneous injection in mice, estradiol is about 10-fold more potent than estrone and about 100-fold more potent than estriol. As such, estradiol is the main estrogen in the body, although the roles of estrone and estriol as estrogens are said not to be negligible.

Selected biological properties of endogenous estrogens in rats
Estrogen	ER RBA (%)	Uterine weight (%)	Uterotrophy	LH levels (%)	SHBG RBA (%)
Control	–	100	–	100	–
Estradiol (E2)	100	506 ± 20	+++	12–19	100
Estrone (E1)	11 ± 8	490 ± 22	+++	?	20
Estriol (E3)	10 ± 4	468 ± 30	+++	8–18	3
Estetrol (E4)	0.5 ± 0.2	?	Inactive	?	1
17α-Estradiol	4.2 ± 0.8	?	?	?	?
2-Hydroxyestradiol	24 ± 7	285 ± 8	+^{b}	31–61	28
2-Methoxyestradiol	0.05 ± 0.04	101	Inactive	?	130
4-Hydroxyestradiol	45 ± 12	?	?	?	?
4-Methoxyestradiol	1.3 ± 0.2	260	++	?	9
4-Fluoroestradiol^{a}	180 ± 43	?	+++	?	?
2-Hydroxyestrone	1.9 ± 0.8	130 ± 9	Inactive	110–142	8
2-Methoxyestrone	0.01 ± 0.00	103 ± 7	Inactive	95–100	120
4-Hydroxyestrone	11 ± 4	351	++	21–50	35
4-Methoxyestrone	0.13 ± 0.04	338	++	65–92	12
16α-Hydroxyestrone	2.8 ± 1.0	552 ± 42	+++	7–24	<0.5
2-Hydroxyestriol	0.9 ± 0.3	302	+^{b}	?	?
2-Methoxyestriol	0.01 ± 0.00	?	Inactive	?	4
Notes: Values are mean ± SD or range. ER RBA = Relative binding affinity to estrogen receptors of rat uterine cytosol. Uterine weight = Percentage change in uterine wet weight of ovariectomized rats after 72 hours with continuous administration of 1 μg/hour via subcutaneously implanted osmotic pumps. LH levels = Luteinizing hormone levels relative to baseline of ovariectomized rats after 24 to 72 hours of continuous administration via subcutaneous implant. Footnotes: ^{a} = Synthetic (i.e., not endogenous). ^{b} = Atypical uterotrophic effect which plateaus within 48 hours (estradiol's uterotrophy continues linearly up to 72 hours). Sources:

== Biochemistry ==
Human steroidogenesis, showing estradiol at bottom right.

=== Biosynthesis ===
Estradiol, like other steroid hormones, is derived from cholesterol. After side chain cleavage and using the Δ^{5} or the Δ^{4}- pathway, androstenedione is the key intermediary. A portion of the androstenedione is converted to testosterone, which in turn undergoes conversion to estradiol by aromatase. In an alternative pathway, androstenedione is aromatized to estrone, which is subsequently converted to estradiol via 17β-hydroxysteroid dehydrogenase (17β-HSD).

During the reproductive years, most estradiol in women is produced by the granulosa cells of the ovaries by the aromatization of androstenedione (produced in the theca folliculi cells) to estrone, followed by conversion of estrone to estradiol by 17β-HSD. Smaller amounts of estradiol are also produced by the adrenal cortex, and, in men, by the testes.

Estradiol is not produced in the gonads only; in particular, fat cells produce active precursors to estradiol, and will continue to do so even after menopause. Estradiol is also produced in the brain and in arterial walls.

In men, approximately 15 to 25% of circulating estradiol is produced in the testicles. The rest is synthesized via peripheral aromatization of testosterone into estradiol and of androstenedione into estrone (which is then transformed into estradiol via peripheral 17β-HSD). This peripheral aromatization occurs predominantly in adipose tissue, but also occurs in other tissues such as bone, liver, and the brain. Approximately 40 to 50 μg of estradiol is produced per day in men.

=== Distribution ===
In plasma, estradiol is largely bound to SHBG and albumin. Only about 2.21% (± 0.04%) of estradiol is free and biologically active. The percentage remains constant throughout the menstrual cycle.

=== Metabolism ===
Metabolic pathways of estradiol in humans

Description: The metabolic pathways involved in the metabolism of estradiol and other natural estrogens (e.g., estrone, estriol) in humans. In addition to the metabolic transformations shown in the diagram, conjugation (e.g., sulfation and glucuronidation) occurs in the case of estradiol and metabolites of estradiol that have one or more available hydroxyl (–OH) groups. Sources: See template page.

Inactivation of estradiol includes conversion to less-active estrogens, such as estrone and estriol. Estriol is the major urinary metabolite. Estradiol is conjugated in the liver to form estrogen conjugates like estradiol sulfate, estradiol glucuronide and, as such, excreted via the kidneys. Some of the water-soluble conjugates are excreted via the bile duct, and partly reabsorbed after hydrolysis from the intestinal tract. This enterohepatic circulation contributes to maintaining estradiol levels.

Estradiol is also metabolized via hydroxylation into catechol estrogens. In the liver, it is non-specifically metabolized by CYP1A2, CYP3A4, and CYP2C9 via 2-hydroxylation into 2-hydroxyestradiol, and by CYP2C9, CYP2C19, and CYP2C8 via 17β-hydroxy dehydrogenation into estrone, with various other cytochrome P450 (CYP) enzymes and metabolic transformations also being involved.

Estradiol is additionally conjugated with an ester into lipoidal estradiol forms like estradiol palmitate and estradiol stearate to a certain extent; these esters are stored in adipose tissue and may act as a very long-lasting reservoir of estradiol.

=== Excretion ===
Estradiol is excreted in the form of glucuronide and sulfate estrogen conjugates in urine. Following an intravenous injection of labeled estradiol in women, almost 90% is excreted in urine and feces within 4 to 5 days. Enterohepatic recirculation causes a delay in excretion of estradiol.

=== Levels ===
Estradiol levels across the menstrual cycle in 36 normally cycling, ovulatory women, based on 956 specimens. The horizontal dashed lines are the mean integrated levels for each curve. The vertical dashed line in the center is mid-cycle.

Levels of estradiol in premenopausal women are highly variable throughout the menstrual cycle and reference ranges widely vary from source to source. Estradiol levels are minimal and according to most laboratories range from 20 to 80 pg/mL during the early to mid follicular phase (or the first week of the menstrual cycle, also known as menses). Levels of estradiol gradually increase during this time and through the mid to late follicular phase (or the second week of the menstrual cycle) until the pre-ovulatory phase. At the time of pre-ovulation (a period of about 24 to 48 hours), estradiol levels briefly surge and reach their highest concentrations of any other time during the menstrual cycle. Circulating levels are typically between 130 and 200 pg/mL at this time, but in some women may be as high as 300 to 400 pg/mL, and the upper limit of the reference range of some laboratories are even greater (for instance, 750 pg/mL). Following ovulation (or mid-cycle) and during the latter half of the menstrual cycle or the luteal phase, estradiol levels plateau and fluctuate between around 100 and 150 pg/mL during the early and mid luteal phase, and at the time of the late luteal phase, or a few days before menstruation, reach a low of around 40 pg/mL. The mean integrated levels of estradiol during a full menstrual cycle have variously been reported by different sources as 80, 120, and 150 pg/mL. Although contradictory reports exist, one study found mean integrated estradiol levels of 150 pg/mL in younger women whereas mean integrated levels ranged from 50 to 120 pg/mL in older women.

During the reproductive years of human females, levels of estradiol are somewhat higher than that of estrone, except during the early follicular phase of the menstrual cycle; thus, estradiol may be considered the predominant estrogen during human female reproductive years in terms of absolute serum levels and estrogenic activity. During pregnancy, estriol becomes the predominant circulating estrogen, and this is the only time at which estetrol occurs in the body, while during menopause, estrone predominates (both based on serum levels). The estradiol produced by male humans, from testosterone, is present at serum levels roughly comparable to those of postmenopausal women (14–55 versus <35 pg/mL, respectively). It has also been reported that if concentrations of estradiol in a 70-year-old man are compared to those of a 70-year-old woman, levels are approximately 2- to 4-fold higher in the man.

Endogenous estradiol production rates and plasma estrogen levels
Group	E2 (prod)	E2 (levels)	E1 (levels)	Ratio
Pubertal girls^{a} Tanner stage I (childhood); Tanner stage II (ages 8–12); Tanner stage III (ages 10–13); Tanner stage IV (ages 11–14); Tanner stage V (ages 12–15); Follicular (days 1–14); Luteal (days 15–28)	? ? ? ? ? ?	9 (<9–20) pg/mL; 15 (<9–30) pg/mL; 27 (<9–60) pg/mL; 55 (16–85) pg/mL 50 (30–100) pg/mL; 130 (70–300) pg/mL	13 (<9–23) pg/mL; 18 (10–37) pg/mL; 26 (17–58) pg/mL; 36 (23–69) pg/mL 44 (30–89) pg/mL; 75 (39–160) pg/mL	? ? ? ? ? ?
Prepubertal boys	?	2–8 pg/mL	?	?
Premenopausal women Early follicular phase (days 1–4); Mid follicular phase (days 5–9); Late follicular phase (days 10–14); Luteal phase (days 15–28); Oral contraceptive (anovulatory)	30–100 μg/day 100–160 μg/day 320–640 μg/day 300 μg/day ?	40–60 pg/mL; 60–100 pg/mL; 200–400 pg/mL; 190 pg/mL; 12–50 pg/mL	40–60 pg/mL ? 170–200 pg/mL; 100–150 pg/mL ?	0.5–1 ? 1–2; 1.5 ?
Postmenopausal women	18 μg/day	5–20 pg/mL	30–70 pg/mL	0.3–0.8
Pregnant women First trimester (weeks 1–12); Second trimester (weeks 13–26); Third trimester (weeks 27–40)	? ? ?	1,000–5,000 pg/mL; 5,000–15,000 pg/mL; 10,000–40,000 pg/mL	? ? ?	? ? ?
Men^{a}	20–60 μg/day	27 (20–55) pg/mL	20–90 pg/mL	0.4–0.6
Footnotes: ^{a} = Format is "mean value (range)" or just "range". Sources:

==== Measurement ====
In women, serum estradiol is measured in a clinical laboratory and reflects primarily the activity of the ovaries. The Estradiol blood test measures the amount of estradiol in the blood. It is used to check the function of the ovaries, placenta, adrenal glands. This can detect baseline estrogen in women with amenorrhea or menstrual dysfunction, and to detect the state of hypoestrogenicity and menopause. Furthermore, estrogen monitoring during fertility therapy assesses follicular growth and is useful in monitoring the treatment. Estrogen-producing tumors will demonstrate persistent high levels of estradiol and other estrogens. In precocious puberty, estradiol levels are inappropriately increased.

==== Ranges ====
Individual laboratory results should always be interpreted using the ranges provided by the laboratory that performed the test.

Reference ranges for serum estradiol
Patient type	Lower limit	Upper limit	Unit
Adult male	50	200	pmol/L
Adult male	14	55	pg/mL
Adult female (follicular phase, day 5)	70; 95% PI (standard)	500; 95% PI	pmol/L
Adult female (follicular phase, day 5)	110; 90% PI (used in diagram)	220; 90% PI	pmol/L
Adult female (follicular phase, day 5)	19 (95% PI)	140 (95% PI)	pg/mL
Adult female (follicular phase, day 5)	30 (90% PI)	60 (90% PI)	pg/mL
Adult female (preovulatory peak)	400	1500	pmol/L
Adult female (preovulatory peak)	110	410	pg/mL
Adult female (luteal phase)	70	600	pmol/L
Adult female (luteal phase)	19	160	pg/mL
Adult female – free (not protein bound)	0.5	9	pg/mL
Adult female – free (not protein bound)	1.7	33	pmol/L
Post-menopausal female	N/A	< 130	pmol/L
Post-menopausal female	N/A	< 35	pg/mL

Reference ranges for the blood content of estradiol during the menstrual cycle

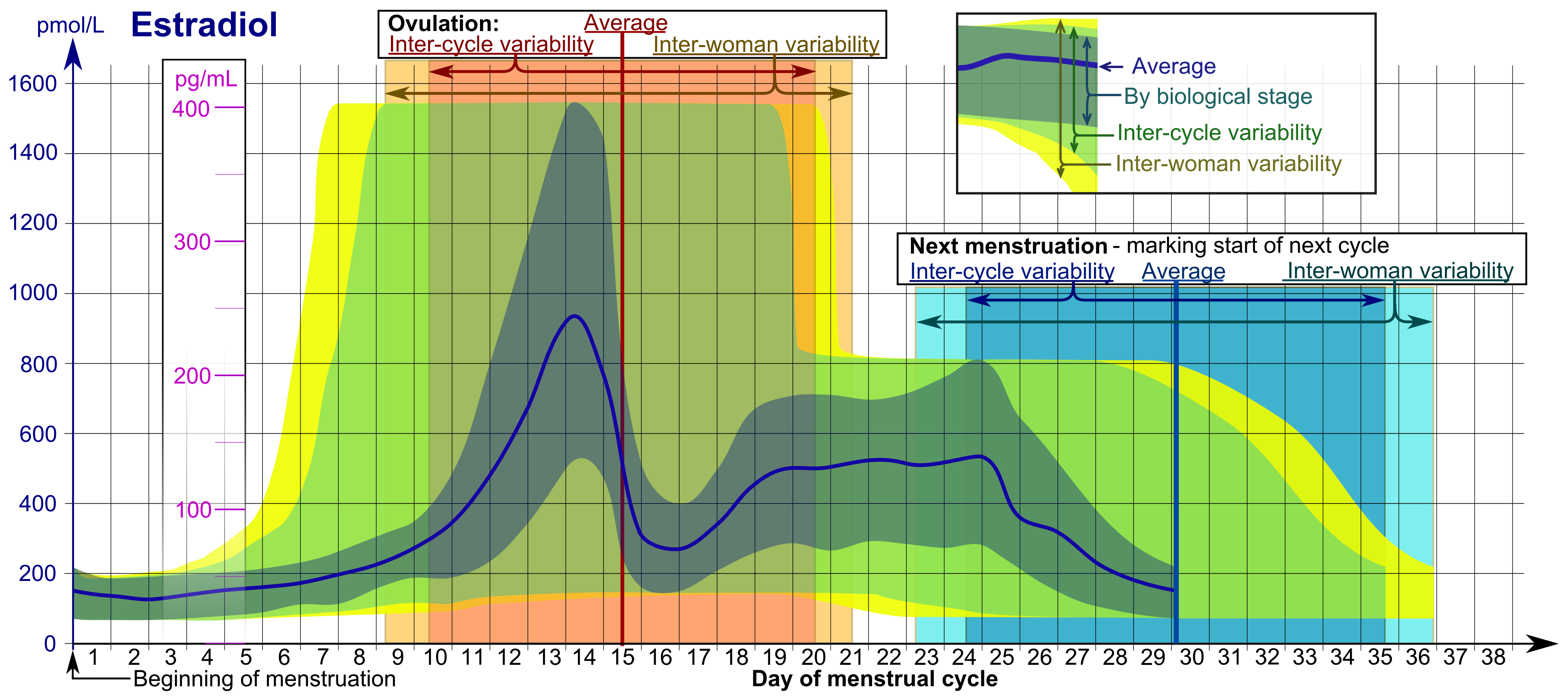
Reference ranges for the blood content of estradiol during the menstrual cycle: The ranges denoted By biological stage may be used in closely monitored menstrual cycles in regard to other markers of its biological progression, with the time scale being compressed or stretched to how much faster or slower, respectively, the cycle progresses compared to an average cycle.; The ranges denoted Inter-cycle variability are more appropriate to use in unmonitored cycles with only the beginning of menstruation known, but where the woman accurately knows her average cycle lengths and time of ovulation, and that they are somewhat averagely regular, with the time scale being compressed or stretched to how much a woman's average cycle length is shorter or longer, respectively, than the average of the population.; The ranges denoted Inter-woman variability are more appropriate to use when the average cycle lengths and time of ovulation are unknown, but only the beginning of menstruation is given.

In the normal menstrual cycle, estradiol levels measure typically <50 pg/mL at menstruation, rise with follicular development (peak: 200 pg/mL), drop briefly at ovulation, and rise again during the luteal phase for a second peak. At the end of the luteal phase, estradiol levels drop to their menstrual levels unless there is a pregnancy.

During pregnancy, estrogen levels, including estradiol, rise steadily toward term. The source of these estrogens is the placenta, which aromatizes prohormones produced in the fetal adrenal gland.

Production rates, secretion rates, clearance rates, and blood levels of major sex hormones
Sex	Sex hormone	Reproductive phase	Blood production rate	Gonadal secretion rate	Metabolic clearance rate	Reference range (serum levels)	
Sex	Sex hormone	Reproductive phase	Blood production rate	Gonadal secretion rate	Metabolic clearance rate	Molar concentration	Mass concentration
Men	Androstenedione	–	2.8 mg/day	1.6 mg/day	2200 L/day	2.8–7.3 nmol/L	80–210 ng/dL
Men	Testosterone	–	6.5 mg/day	6.2 mg/day	950 L/day	6.9–34.7 nmol/L	200–1000 ng/dL
Men	Estrone	–	150 μg/day	110 μg/day	2050 L/day	37–250 pmol/L	10–70 pg/mL
Men	Estradiol	–	60 μg/day	50 μg/day	1600 L/day	<37–210 pmol/L	10–57 pg/mL
Men	Estrone sulfate	–	80 μg/day	Insignificant	167 L/day	600–2500 pmol/L	200–900 pg/mL
Women	Androstenedione	–	3.2 mg/day	2.8 mg/day	2000 L/day	3.1–12.2 nmol/L	89–350 ng/dL
Women	Testosterone	–	190 μg/day	60 μg/day	500 L/day	0.7–2.8 nmol/L	20–81 ng/dL
Women	Estrone	Follicular phase	110 μg/day	80 μg/day	2200 L/day	110–400 pmol/L	30–110 pg/mL
Women	Estrone	Luteal phase	260 μg/day	150 μg/day	2200 L/day	310–660 pmol/L	80–180 pg/mL
Women	Estrone	Postmenopause	40 μg/day	Insignificant	1610 L/day	22–230 pmol/L	6–60 pg/mL
Women	Estradiol	Follicular phase	90 μg/day	80 μg/day	1200 L/day	<37–360 pmol/L	10–98 pg/mL
Women	Estradiol	Luteal phase	250 μg/day	240 μg/day	1200 L/day	699–1250 pmol/L	190–341 pg/mL
Women	Estradiol	Postmenopause	6 μg/day	Insignificant	910 L/day	<37–140 pmol/L	10–38 pg/mL
Women	Estrone sulfate	Follicular phase	100 μg/day	Insignificant	146 L/day	700–3600 pmol/L	250–1300 pg/mL
Women	Estrone sulfate	Luteal phase	180 μg/day	Insignificant	146 L/day	1100–7300 pmol/L	400–2600 pg/mL
Women	Progesterone	Follicular phase	2 mg/day	1.7 mg/day	2100 L/day	0.3–3 nmol/L	0.1–0.9 ng/mL
Women	Progesterone	Luteal phase	25 mg/day	24 mg/day	2100 L/day	19–45 nmol/L	6–14 ng/mL
Notes and sources Notes: "The concentration of a steroid in the circulation is determined by the rate at which it is secreted from glands, the rate of metabolism of precursor or prehormones into the steroid, and the rate at which it is extracted by tissues and metabolized. The secretion rate of a steroid refers to the total secretion of the compound from a gland per unit time. Secretion rates have been assessed by sampling the venous effluent from a gland over time and subtracting out the arterial and peripheral venous hormone concentration. The metabolic clearance rate of a steroid is defined as the volume of blood that has been completely cleared of the hormone per unit time. The production rate of a steroid hormone refers to entry into the blood of the compound from all possible sources, including secretion from glands and conversion of prohormones into the steroid of interest. At steady state, the amount of hormone entering the blood from all sources will be equal to the rate at which it is being cleared (metabolic clearance rate) multiplied by blood concentration (production rate = metabolic clearance rate × concentration). If there is little contribution of prohormone metabolism to the circulating pool of steroid, then the production rate will approximate the secretion rate." Sources: See template.

== Medical use ==
Estradiol is used as a medication, primarily in hormone therapy for menopausal symptoms as well as feminizing hormone therapy for transgender individuals.

== Chemistry ==
Structures of major endogenous estrogens
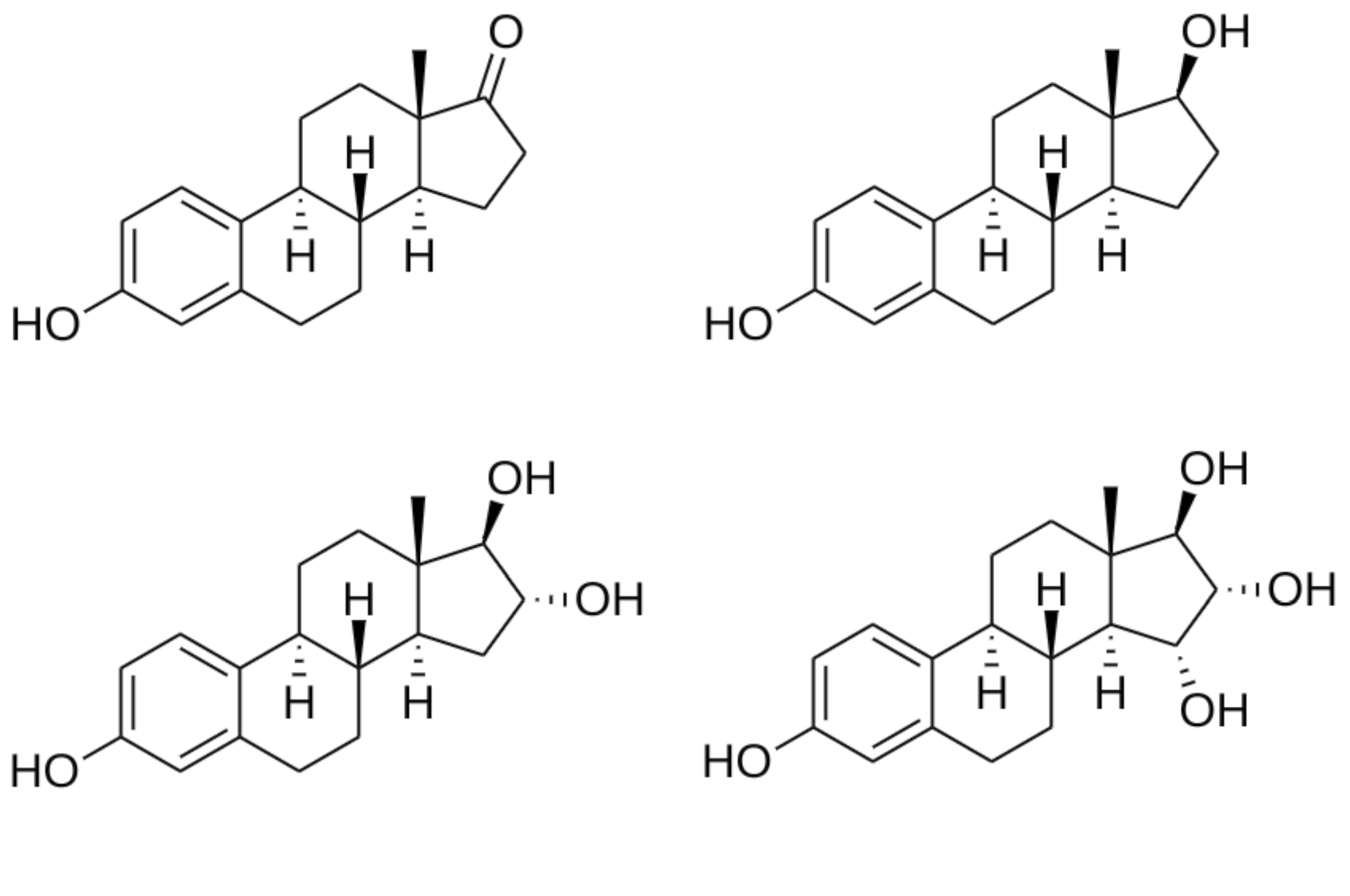
Note the hydroxyl (–OH) groups: estrone (E1) has one, estradiol (E2) has two, estriol (E3) has three, and estetrol (E4) has four.

Estradiol is an estrane steroid. It is also known as 17β-estradiol (to distinguish it from 17α-estradiol) or as estra-1,3,5(10)-triene-3,17β-diol. It has two hydroxyl groups, one at the C3 position and the other at the 17β position, as well as three double bonds in the A ring. Due to its two hydroxyl groups, estradiol is often abbreviated as E2. The structurally related estrogens, estrone (E1), estriol (E3), and estetrol (E4) have one, three, and four hydroxyl groups, respectively.

== Neuropsychopharmacology ==
Product insert information, accompanying commercial prescription estradiol, indicates it causes depression. In a randomized, double-blind, placebo-controlled study, estradiol was shown to have gender-specific effects on fairness sensitivity. Overall, when the division of a given amount of money was framed as either fair or unfair in a modified version of the ultimatum game, estradiol increased the acceptance rate of fair-framed proposals among men and decreased it among women. However, among the placebo-group "the mere belief of receiving estradiol treatment significantly increased the acceptance of unfair-framed offers in both sexes", indicating that so-called "environmental" factors played a role in organising the responses towards these presentations of the ultimatum game.

== History ==
The discovery of estrogen is usually credited to the American scientists Edgar Allen and Edward A. Doisy. In 1923, they observed that injection of fluid from porcine ovarian follicles produced pubertal- and estrus-type changes (including vaginal, uterine, and mammary gland changes and sexual receptivity) in sexually immature, ovariectomized mice and rats. These findings demonstrated the existence of a hormone which is produced by the ovaries and is involved in sexual maturation and reproduction. At the time of its discovery, Allen and Doisy did not name the hormone, and simply referred to it as an "ovarian hormone" or "follicular hormone"; others referred to it variously as feminin, folliculin, menformon, thelykinin, and emmenin. In 1926, Parkes and Bellerby coined the term estrin to describe the hormone on the basis of it inducing estrus in animals. Estrone was isolated and purified independently by Allen and Doisy and German scientist Adolf Butenandt in 1929, and estriol was isolated and purified by Marrian in 1930; they were the first estrogens to be identified.

Estradiol, the most potent of the three major estrogens, was the last of the three to be identified. It was discovered by Schwenk and Hildebrant in 1933, who synthesized it via reduction of estrone. A few milligrams of estradiol was subsequently isolated and purified from 4 tons of sow ovaries by Doisy in 1935, with its chemical structure determined simultaneously, and was referred to variously as dihydrotheelin, dihydrofolliculin, dihydrofollicular hormone, and dihydroxyestrin. In 1935, the name estradiol and the term estrogen were formally established by the Sex Hormone Committee of the Health Organization of the League of Nations; this followed the names estrone (which was initially called theelin, progynon, folliculin, and ketohydroxyestrin) and estriol (initially called theelol and trihydroxyestrin) having been established in 1932 at the first meeting of the International Conference on the Standardization of Sex Hormones in London. Following its discovery, a partial synthesis of estradiol from cholesterol was developed by Inhoffen and Hohlweg in 1940, and a total synthesis was developed by Anner and Miescher in 1948.

== Society and culture ==
=== Etymology ===
The name estradiol derives from estra-, Gk. οἶστρος (oistros, literally meaning "verve or inspiration"), which refers to the estrane steroid ring system, and -diol, a chemical term and suffix indicating that the compound is a type of alcohol bearing two hydroxyl groups.
