= ER-X =

ER-X is a membrane-associated receptor that is bound and activated by 17α-estradiol and 17β-estradiol and is a putative membrane estrogen receptor (mER). It shows sequence homology with ERα and ERβ and activates the MAPK/ERK pathway. The receptor is insensitive to the antiestrogen ICI-182,780 (fulvestrant).

== See also ==
- ERx
- GPER (GPR30)
- G_{q}-mER
- Estrogen receptor
