= 4-hydroxybenzaldehyde dehydrogenase =

Class of enzymes

Identifiers
- EC no.: 1.2.1.64

Databases
- IntEnz: IntEnz view
- BRENDA: BRENDA entry
- ExPASy: NiceZyme view
- KEGG: KEGG entry
- MetaCyc: metabolic pathway
- PRIAM: profile
- PDB structures: RCSB PDB PDBe PDBsum
- Gene Ontology: AmiGO / QuickGO
Search
- PMC: articles
- PubMed: articles
- NCBI: proteins

In enzymology, 4-hydroxybenzaldehyde dehydrogenase (EC 1.2.1.64) is an enzyme that catalyzes the chemical reaction

4-Hydroxybenzaldehyde
+ NAD^{+}
H_{2}O
H^{+}
H_{2}O
H^{+}
4-Hydroxybenzoic acid
+ NADH

The three substrates of this enzyme are 4-hydroxybenzaldehyde, oxidised nicotinamide adenine dinucleotide (NAD^{+}), and water. Its products are 4-hydroxybenzoic acid, reduced NADH, and a proton.

This enzyme belongs to the family of oxidoreductases, specifically those acting on the aldehyde or oxo group of donor with NAD+ or NADP+ as acceptor. The systematic name of this enzyme class is 3-hydroxybenzaldehyde:NAD+ oxidoreductase. This enzyme is also called p-hydroxybenzaldehyde dehydrogenase. This enzyme participates in toluene and xylene degradation in bacteria. It is also found in carrots (Daucus carota).
