= Gq-mER =

The G_{q}-coupled membrane estrogen receptor (G_{q}-mER) is a G protein-coupled receptor present in the hypothalamus that has not yet been cloned. It is a membrane-associated receptor that is G_{q}-coupled to a phospholipase C–protein kinase C–protein kinase A (PLC–PKC–PKA) pathway. The receptor has been implicated in the control of energy homeostasis. G_{q}-mER is bound and activated by estradiol, and is a putative membrane estrogen receptor (mER). A nonsteroidal diphenylacrylamide derivative, STX, which is structurally related to 4-hydroxytamoxifen (afimoxifene), is an agonist of the receptor with greater potency than estradiol (20-fold higher affinity) that has been discovered. Fulvestrant (ICI-182,780) has been identified as an antagonist of G_{q}-mER, but is not selective.

== See also ==
- Estrogen receptor
- GPER (GPR30)
- ER-X
- ERx
