= MIBE =

Chemical compound

Identifiers
- IUPAC name: Ethyl 3-[5-(2-ethoxycarbonyl-1-methylvinyloxy)-1-methyl-1H-indol-3-yl]but-2-enoate
- CAS Number: 2956502-79-5

Chemical and physical data
- Formula: C_{21}H_{25}NO_{5}
- Molar mass: 371.433 g·mol^{−1}
- 3D model (JSmol): Interactive image
- SMILES: C(OC(/C=C(/OC1=CC=C2C(C(/C(/C)=C/C(OCC)=O)=CN2C)=C1)\C)=O)C
- InChI: InChI=1S/C21H25NO5/c1-6-25-20(23)10-14(3)18-13-22(5)19-9-8-16(12-17(18)19)27-15(4)11-21(24)26-7-2/h8-13H,6-7H2,1-5H3/b14-10+,15-11+; Key:VFEAHZYKQWLUSD-WFYKWJGLSA-N

MIBE is a synthetic, nonsteroidal antiestrogen that acts as a dual antagonist of the ERα and the GPER. It was found to prevent estradiol-induced proliferation of MCF-7 breast cancer cells, an action that was mediated via inhibition of both receptors. The drug was synthesized in 2012. It has been suggested that drugs like MIBE might be superior agents in the treatment of breast cancer compared to current antiestrogens like tamoxifen and fulvestrant, which are antagonistic at the ERα but were found in 2005 to be GPER agonists.
