= 3-hydroxybenzyl-alcohol dehydrogenase =

Class of enzymes

Identifiers
- EC no.: 1.1.1.97
- CAS no.: 9075-73-4

Databases
- IntEnz: IntEnz view
- BRENDA: BRENDA entry
- ExPASy: NiceZyme view
- KEGG: KEGG entry
- MetaCyc: metabolic pathway
- PRIAM: profile
- PDB structures: RCSB PDB PDBe PDBsum
- Gene Ontology: AmiGO / QuickGO
Search
- PMC: articles
- PubMed: articles
- NCBI: proteins

In enzymology, 3-hydroxybenzyl-alcohol dehydrogenase (EC 1.1.1.97) is an enzyme that catalyzes the chemical reaction

3-hydroxybenzyl alcohol
+ NADP^{+}
H^{+}
H^{+}
3-hydroxybenzaldehyde
+ NADPH

The two substrates of this enzyme are 3-hydroxybenzyl alcohol and oxidised nicotinamide adenine dinucleotide phosphate (NADP^{+}). Its products are 3-hydroxybenzaldehyde, reduced NADPH, and a proton.

This enzyme belongs to the family of oxidoreductases, specifically those acting on the CH-OH group of donor with NAD^{+} or NADP^{+} as acceptor. The systematic name of this enzyme class is 3-hydroxybenzyl-alcohol:NADP^{+} oxidoreductase. Other names in common use include m-hydroxybenzyl alcohol dehydrogenase, m-hydroxybenzyl alcohol (NADP^{+}) dehydrogenase, and m-hydroxybenzylalcohol dehydrogenase. This enzyme participates in toluene and xylene degradation.
