= Dihydroxybenzaldehyde =

Dihydroxybenzaldehyde may refer to:

- 2,4-Dihydroxybenzaldehyde
- 3,4-Dihydroxybenzaldehyde
- 2,5-Dihydroxybenzaldehyde (gentisaldehyde)
