= GPER =

Protein-coding gene in the species Homo sapiens

GPER1

Identifiers
- Aliases: GPER1, Gper1, 6330420K13Rik, CMKRL2, Ceprl, FEG-1, GPCR-Br, Gper, Gpr30, CEPR, DRY12, LERGU, LERGU2, LyGPR, mER, G protein-coupled estrogen receptor 1
- External IDs: OMIM: 601805; MGI: 1924104; GeneCards: GPER1

Gene location (Human)
Chr.	Chromosome 7 (human)
Band	7p22.3	Start	1,082,208 bp
Band	7p22.3	End	1,093,815 bp

Gene location (Mouse)
Chr.	Chromosome 5 (mouse)
Band	5|5 G2	Start	139,408,906 bp
Band	5|5 G2	End	139,413,555 bp
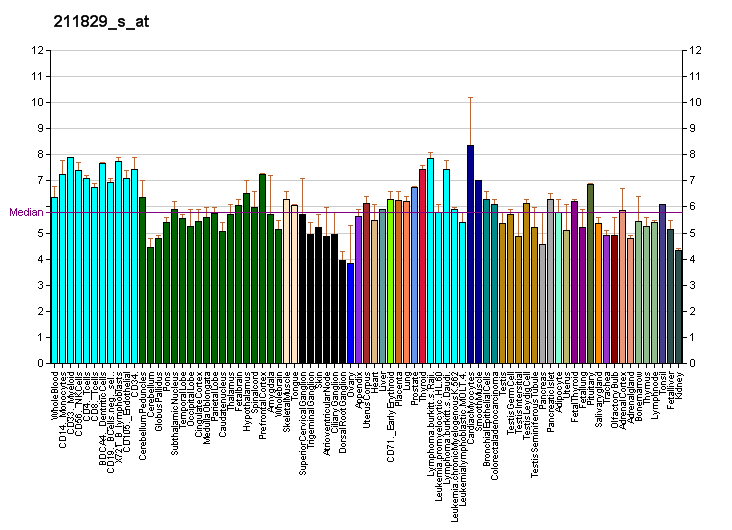

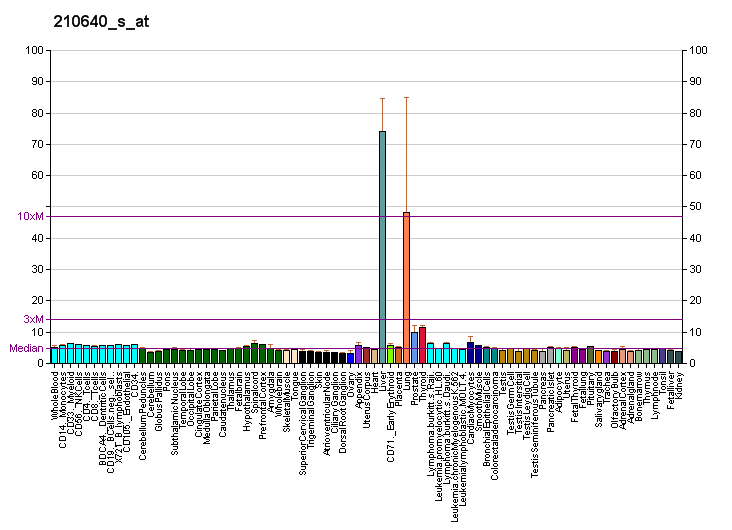
RNA expression pattern
Bgee	Human / Mouse (ortholog); Top expressed in: body of stomach; middle frontal gyrus; fundus; frontal pole; paraflocculus of cerebellum; tendon of biceps brachii; right lobe of liver; apex of heart; testicle; right adrenal cortex / Top expressed in: external carotid artery; otolith organ; utricle; internal carotid artery; condyle; fossa; trigeminal ganglion; epithelium of stomach; substantia nigra; hand; More reference expression data
BioGPS	More reference expression data
Gene ontology
Molecular function	estrogen receptor activity; steroid hormone binding; chromatin binding; protein binding; signal transducer activity; steroid binding; G protein-coupled receptor activity; steroid hormone receptor activity
Cellular component	cytoplasm; endosome; nuclear envelope; membrane; synapse; trans-Golgi network; mitochondrion; perinuclear region of cytoplasm; cytoskeleton; nucleus; cell projection; mitochondrial membranes; keratin filament; dendritic shaft; dendritic spine head; endoplasmic reticulum; dendritic spine membrane; integral component of membrane; recycling endosome; Golgi apparatus; plasma membrane; intracellular anatomical structure; presynaptic active zone; axon; early endosome; axon terminus; endoplasmic reticulum membrane; postsynaptic density; Golgi membrane; integral component of plasma membrane; cell junction; dendrite; cytoplasmic vesicle membrane; presynaptic membrane; cytoplasmic vesicle; hippocampal mossy fiber to CA3 synapse
Biological process	positive regulation of protein phosphorylation; positive regulation of cysteine-type endopeptidase activity involved in apoptotic process; positive regulation of G protein-coupled receptor signaling pathway; positive regulation of ERK1 and ERK2 cascade; positive regulation of extrinsic apoptotic signaling pathway; cell cycle; negative regulation of inflammatory response; cellular response to glucose stimulus; steroid hormone mediated signaling pathway; negative regulation of cell population proliferation; apoptotic process; negative regulation of fat cell differentiation; negative regulation of leukocyte activation; apoptotic chromosome condensation; regulation of cytosolic calcium ion concentration; positive regulation of neurotransmitter secretion; negative regulation of gene expression; nuclear fragmentation involved in apoptotic nuclear change; positive regulation of endothelial cell apoptotic process; positive regulation of inositol trisphosphate biosynthetic process; positive regulation of cardiac vascular smooth muscle cell differentiation; innate immune response; inflammatory response; positive regulation of MAPK cascade; G protein-coupled receptor signaling pathway; negative regulation of protein kinase B signaling; cell differentiation; immune system process; negative regulation of cell cycle process; positive regulation of release of sequestered calcium ion into cytosol; negative regulation of lipid biosynthetic process; nervous system development; positive regulation of neurogenesis; positive regulation of release of cytochrome c from mitochondria; positive regulation of epidermal growth factor receptor signaling pathway; positive regulation of insulin secretion; negative regulation of vascular associated smooth muscle cell proliferation; positive regulation of cell migration; positive regulation of cytosolic calcium ion concentration; cellular response to tumor necrosis factor; cellular response to estradiol stimulus; cellular response to peptide hormone stimulus; positive regulation of gene expression; cellular response to mineralocorticoid stimulus; positive regulation of cell population proliferation; negative regulation of ERK1 and ERK2 cascade; negative regulation of DNA metabolic process; positive regulation of transcription by RNA polymerase II; positive regulation of uterine smooth muscle contraction; neuronal action potential; signal transduction; mineralocorticoid receptor signaling pathway; positive regulation of phosphatidylinositol 3-kinase signaling; positive regulation of apoptotic process; intracellular steroid hormone receptor signaling pathway; positive regulation of protein localization to plasma membrane; adenylate cyclase-activating G protein-coupled receptor signaling pathway; modulation of chemical synaptic transmission
Sources:Amigo / QuickGO
Orthologs
Databases	NCBI: entry; OMA: entry
Species	Human	Mouse
Entrez	2852	76854
Ensembl	ENSG00000164850	ENSMUSG00000053647
UniProt	Q99527	Q8BMP4
RefSeq (mRNA)	NM_001031682; NM_001039966; NM_001098201; NM_001505	NM_029771
RefSeq (protein)	NP_001035055; NP_001091671; NP_001496	NP_084047
Location (UCSC)	Chr 7: 1.08 – 1.09 Mb	Chr 5: 139.41 – 139.41 Mb
PubMed search
- Wikidata
View/Edit Human	View/Edit Mouse

G protein-coupled estrogen receptor 1 (GPER), also known as G protein-coupled receptor 30 (GPR30), is a protein that in humans is encoded by the GPER gene. GPER binds to and is activated by the female sex hormone estradiol and is responsible for some of the rapid effects that estradiol has on cells.

== Discovery ==
The classical estrogen receptors first characterized in 1958 are water-soluble proteins located in the interior of cells that are activated by estrogenenic hormones such as estradiol and several of its metabolites such as estrone or estriol. These proteins belong to the nuclear hormone receptor class of transcription factors that regulate gene transcription. Since it takes time for genes to be transcribed into RNA and translated into protein, the effects of estrogens binding to these classical estrogen receptors is delayed. However, estrogens are also known to have effects that are too fast to be caused by regulation of gene transcription. In 2005, it was discovered that a member of the G protein-coupled receptor (GPCR) family, GPR30 also binds with high affinity to estradiol and is responsible in part for the rapid non-genomic actions of estradiol. Based on its ability to bind estradiol, GPR30 was renamed as G protein-coupled estrogen receptor (GPER). GPER is localized in the plasma membrane but is predominantly detected in the endoplasmic reticulum.

== Ligands ==
GPER binds estradiol with high affinity though not other endogenous estrogens, such as estrone or estriol, nor other endogenous steroids, including progesterone, testosterone, and cortisol. Although potentially involved in signaling by aldosterone, GPER does not show any detectable binding towards aldosterone. Niacin and nicotinamide bind to the receptor in vitro with very low affinity. CCL18 has been identified as an endogenous antagonist of the GPER. GPER-selective ligands (that do not bind the classical estrogen receptors) include the agonist G-1 and the antagonists G15 and G36.

=== Agonists ===
- 2-Methoxyestradiol
- 2,2',5'-PCB-4-OH
- Afimoxifene
- Aldosterone
- Atrazine
- Bisphenol A
- Daidzein
- DDT (p,p'-DDT, o',p'-DDE)
- Diarylpropionitrile (DPN)
- Equol
- Estradiol
- Ethynylestradiol
- Fulvestrant (ICI-182780))
- G-1
- Genistein
- GPER-L1
- GPER-L2
- Hydroxytyrosol
- Kepone
- LNS8801
- Niacin
- Nicotinamide
- Nonylphenol
- Oleuropein
- Protocatechuic aldehyde
- Propylpyrazoletriol (PPT)
- Quercetin
- Raloxifene
- Resveratrol
- STX
- Tamoxifen
- Tectoridin

=== Antagonists ===
- CCL18
- Estriol
- G15
- G36
- MIBE

=== Unknown ===
- Diethylstilbestrol
- Zearalenone

=== Non-ligand ===
- 17α-Estradiol
- Estrone

== Function ==
This protein is a member of the rhodopsin-like family of G protein-coupled receptors and is a multi-pass membrane protein that localizes to the plasma membrane. The protein binds estradiol, resulting in intracellular calcium mobilization and synthesis of phosphatidylinositol (3,4,5)-trisphosphate in the nucleus. This protein therefore plays a role in the rapid nongenomic signaling events widely observed following stimulation of cells and tissues with estradiol. The distribution of GPER is well established in the rodent, with high expression observed in the hypothalamus, pituitary gland, adrenal medulla, kidney medulla and developing follicles of the ovary.

== Role in cancer ==
GPER expression has been studied in cancer using immunohistochemical and transcriptomic approaches, and has been detected in: colon, lung, melanoma, pancreatic, breast, ovarian, and testicular cancer.

Many groups have demonstrated that GPER signaling is tumor suppressive in cancers that are not traditionally hormone responsive, including melanoma, pancreatic, lung and colon cancer. Additionally, many groups have demonstrated that GPER activation is also tumor suppressive in cancers that are classically considered sex hormone responsive, including endometrial cancer, ovarian cancer, prostate cancer, and Leydig cell tumors. Although GPER signaling was originally thought to be tumor promoting in some breast cancer models, subsequent reports show that GPER signaling inhibits breast cancer. Consistent with this, recent studies showed that the presence of GPER protein in human breast cancer tissue correlates with longer survival. In summary, many independent groups have demonstrated that GPER activation may be a therapeutically useful mechanism for a wide range of cancer types.

Linnaeus Therapeutics is currently running NCI clinical trial (NCT04130516) using GPER agonist, LNS8801, as monotherapy and in combination with the immune checkpoint inhibitor, pembrolizumab, for the treatment of multiple solid tumor malignancies. Activation of GPER with LNS8801 has demonstrated efficacy in humans in cutaneous melanoma, uveal melanoma, lung cancer, neuroendocrine cancer, colorectal cancer, and other PD-1 inhibitor refractory cancers.

== Role in normal tissues ==
=== Reproductive tissue ===
Estradiol produces cell proliferation in both normal and malignant breast epithelial tissue. However, GPER knockout mice show no overt mammary phenotype, unlike ERα knockout mice, but similarly to ERβ knockout mice. This indicates that although GPER and ERβ play a modulatory role in breast development, ERα is the main receptor responsible for estrogen-mediated breast tissue growth. GPER is expressed in germ cells and has been found to be essential for male fertility, specifically, in spermatogenesis. GPER has been found to modulate gonadotropin-releasing hormone (GnRH) secretion in the hypothalamic-pituitary-gonadal (HPG) axis.

=== Cardiovascular effects ===
GPER is expressed in the blood vessel endothelium and is responsible for vasodilation and as a result, blood pressure lowering effects of estradiol. GPER also regulates components of the renin–angiotensin system, which also controls blood pressure, and is required for superoxide-mediated cardiovascular function and aging.

=== Central nervous system activity ===
GPER and ERα, but not ERβ, have been found to mediate the antidepressant-like effects of estradiol. Contrarily, activation of GPER has been found to be anxiogenic in mice, while activation of ERβ has been found to be anxiolytic. There is a high expression of GPER, as well as ERβ, in oxytocin neurons in various parts of the hypothalamus, including the paraventricular nucleus and the supraoptic nucleus. It is speculated that activation of GPER may be the mechanism by which estradiol mediates rapid effects on the oxytocin system, for instance, rapidly increasing oxytocin receptor expression. Estradiol has also been found to increase oxytocin levels and release in the medial preoptic area and medial basal hypothalamus, actions that may be mediated by activation of GPER and/or ERβ. Estradiol, as well as tamoxifen and fulvestrant, have been found to rapidly induce lordosis through activation of GPER in the arcuate nucleus of the hypothalamus of female rats.

=== Metabolic roles ===
Female GPER knockout mice display hyperglycemia and impaired glucose tolerance, reduced body growth, and increased blood pressure. Male GPER knockout mice are observed to have increased growth, body fat, insulin resistance and glucose intolerance, dyslipidemia, increased osteoblast function (mineralization), resulting in higher bone mineral density and trabecular bone volume, and persistent growth plate activity resulting in longer bones. The GPER-selective agonist G-1 shows therapeutic efficacy in mouse models of obesity and diabetes.

=== Role in neurological disorders ===
GPER is broadly expressed on the nervous system, and GPER activation promotes beneficial effects in several brain disorders. A study suggests that GPER levels were significantly lower in children with ADHD compared to controls.

== See also ==
- Membrane estrogen receptor
- G_{q}-mER
- ER-X
- ERx
