= Salicylaldoxime =

Names
- IUPAC name Salicylaldehyde oxime
- Other names Saldox; 2-[(E)-(hydroxyimino)methyl]phenol

Identifiers
| CAS Number | 94-67-7 |
| 3D model (JSmol) | Interactive image |
| ChemSpider | 10446269 |
| ECHA InfoCard | 100.002.140 |
| PubChem CID | 5359280 |
| UNII | 2QTV2A0T5Q |
| CompTox Dashboard (EPA) | DTXSID9052638 |
- InChI: InChI=1S/C7H7NO2/c9-7-4-2-1-3-6(7)5-8-10/h1-5,9-10H/b8-5- Key: ORIHZIZPTZTNCU-YVMONPNESA-N; InChI=1/C7H7NO2/c9-7-4-2-1-3-6(7)5-8-10/h1-5,9-10H/b8-5- Key: ORIHZIZPTZTNCU-YVMONPNEBT
- SMILES: Oc1ccccc1/C=N\O

Properties
| Chemical formula | C_{7}H_{7}NO_{2} |
| Molar mass | 137.138 g·mol^{−1} |
| Appearance | white to off-white crystals |
| Melting point | 59 to 61 °C (138 to 142 °F; 332 to 334 K) |
| Solubility in water | 25 g L^{−1} |

Hazards
| NFPA 704 (fire diamond) | 2 1 0 |
- Except where otherwise noted, data are given for materials in their standard state (at 25 °C [77 °F], 100 kPa). verify (what is ?) Infobox references

Salicylaldoxime is an organic compound described by the formula HO-C_{6}H_{4}CH=NOH. It is the oxime of salicylaldehyde. This crystalline, colorless solid is a chelator and sometimes used in the analysis of samples containing transition metal ions, with which it often forms brightly coloured coordination complexes.

== Reactions ==
Salicylaldoxime is the conjugate acid of a bidentate ligand:

2 HO-C_{6}H_{4}CH=NOH + Cu^{2+} → Cu(O-C_{6}H_{4}CH=NOH)_{2} + 2 H^{+}

In highly acidic media, the ligand protonates, and the metal aquo complex and aldoxime are liberated. In this way the ligand is used as a recyclable extractant. It typically forms charge-neutral complexes with divalent metal ions.

== Analytical chemistry ==
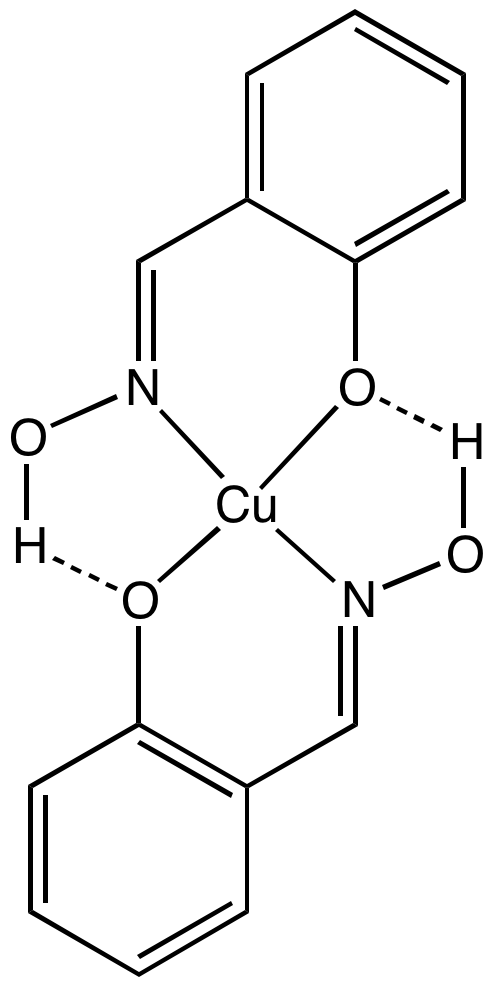
Structure of the copper(II) complex of the conjugate base of salicylaldoxime. The hydroxyl groups form hydrogen bonds to the phenolate oxygens.

In the era when metals were analysed by spectrophotometry, many chelating ligands were developed that selectively formed brightly coloured complexes with particular metal ions. This methodology has been eclipsed with the introduction of inductively coupled plasma methodology. Salicylaldoxime can be used to selectively precipitate metal ions for gravimetric determination. It forms a greenish-yellow precipitate with copper at a pH of 2.6 in the presence of acetic acid. Under these conditions, this is the only metal that precipitates; at pH 3.3, nickel also precipitates. Iron (III) will interfere. It has been used as an ionophore in ion selective electrodes, with good response to Pb^{2+} and Ni^{2+}.

== Extraction of metals ==
Saloximes are used in the extraction and separation of metals from their ores. In one application of hydrometallurgy, Cu^{2+} is extracted into organic solvents as its saloxime complex.
