= Hydroxybenzaldehyde =

Hydroxybenzaldehydes are phenolic aldehydes. The term may refer to:

- Salicylaldehyde (2-hydroxybenzaldehyde)
- 3-Hydroxybenzaldehyde
- 4-Hydroxybenzaldehyde
