= Membrane estrogen receptor =

Membrane estrogen receptors (mERs) are a group of receptors which bind estrogen. Unlike nuclear estrogen receptors, which mediate their effects via slower genomic mechanisms, mERs are cell surface receptors that rapidly alter cell signaling via modulation of intracellular signaling cascades.

Nuclear estrogen receptors such as ERα and ERβ become mERs through palmitoylation, a post-translational modification that enhances ER association with caveolin-1 to enable trafficking of ERs to the membrane or membrane caveolae. Other putative mERs include GPER (GPR30), GPRC6A, ER-X, ERx and G_{q}-mER.

ERα/ERβ becoming mERs through trafficking to the membrane by caveolins, following palmitoylation.

== Structure-function relationship ==
In mice and humans, ERβ localization in the plasma membrane occurs after palmitoylation on cysteine 418. Dimerization of mERs appears necessary for their function in rapid cell signaling.

== Signaling mechanisms ==
=== G-protein coupled receptors ===
Various electrophysiological studies support E2 signaling via GPCRs. mERs are thought to activate G-protein coupled receptors to regulate L-type Ca2+ channels and activate protein kinase A (PKA), protein kinase C (PKC), and mitogen activated protein kinase (MAPK) signaling cascades.

Gq-coupled mERs (Gq-mERs) activation has been demonstrated to rapidly increase membrane excitability various neuronal cell types by desensitizing GABA_{B} receptor coupling to G protein-coupled inwardly rectifying K+ channels (GIRKs).

=== mGluRs ===
Localization of mERs in caveolae allows them to be held in close proximity to specific receptors such as mGluRs. Various studies have demonstrated mER's ability to activate mGluR signaling, even in the absence of glutamate. ER/mGluR signaling is thought to be highly relevant for female motivational behavior. Interestingly, modification of caveolin expression appears to alter the nature of ER-mGluR interactions.

== Clinical significance ==
Membrane estrogen receptors have been implicated in reproductive, cardiovascular, neural, and immune function, including cancer, neurodegenerative disease, and cardiovascular disorders.

=== Cancer ===
GPER1 pathways modify local inflammation and strengthen cellular immune responses in breast cancer and melanoma, making it a strong prognostic marker.

=== Neurodegenerative disease ===
mERs have a demonstrated neuroprotective effect against neurodegenerative disorders like Parkinson's disease, which is thought to underlie the lower incidence of the disorder in women compared to men.

=== Cardiovascular disorders ===
mERβ has been demonstrated to mitigate cardiac cell pathology caused by angiotensin II. Activation of mER but not nuclear ER signaling in vascular epithelial cells promotes protection against vascular injury in mice. Striatin, a scaffolding protein that links mERs to membrane caveolae, is necessary for this effect.

=== Addiction ===
Propensity to addiction appears to be mediated by sex hormones such as estrogen. In neural reward circuity, nuclear ERs are not commonly expressed, and mERs have been demonstrated to act on mGluR5 to facilitate psychostimulant-induced behavioral and neurochemical effects.

== See also ==
- Membrane steroid receptor
- Estrogen receptor
