= 4-Hydroxyphenylglycine =

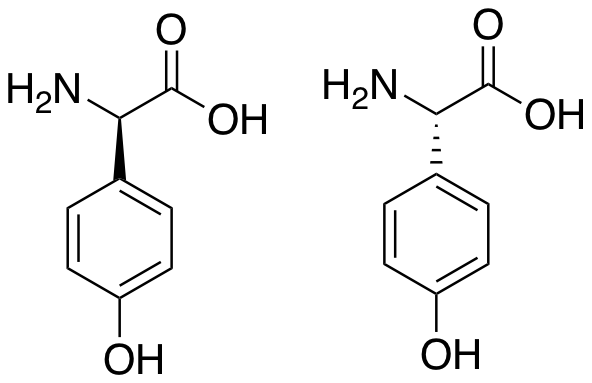
- 4-Hydroxyphenylglycine (HPG). (R)-D-HPG shown on left; (S)-L-HPG shown on right.

Names
- IUPAC name Nortyrosine
- Systematic IUPAC name Amino(4-hydroxyphenyl)acetic acid
- Other names 3-Amino-2,3,6-trideoxy-3-methyl-L-lyxo-hexopyranose

Identifiers
CAS Number	37784-25-1
3D model (JSmol)	Interactive image
Beilstein Reference	513130
ChEBI	CHEBI:50418; CHEBI:15695 D
ChEMBL	ChEMBL130865
ChemSpider	83189
ECHA InfoCard	100.012.139
EC Number	213-353-2
KEGG	C03493 D
PubChem CID	92143
UNII	7UYG7X0F53
CompTox Dashboard (EPA)	DTXSID90860473
- InChI: Key: LJCWONGJFPCTTL-UHFFFAOYSA-N
- SMILES: C1=CC(=CC=C1C(C(=O)O)N)O

Properties
Chemical formula	C_{8}H_{9}NO_{3}
Molar mass	167.164 g·mol^{−1}
- Except where otherwise noted, data are given for materials in their standard state (at 25 °C [77 °F], 100 kPa). Infobox references

4-Hydroxyphenylglycine (HPG) is a non-proteogenic amino acid found in vancomycin and related glycopeptides. HPG is synthesized from the shikimic acid pathway and requires four enzymes to synthesize: Both L- and D-HPG are used in the vancomycin class of antibiotics. Tyrosine, a similar amino acid, differs by a methylene group (CH2) between the aromatic ring and the alpha carbon.

== Biosynthesis ==
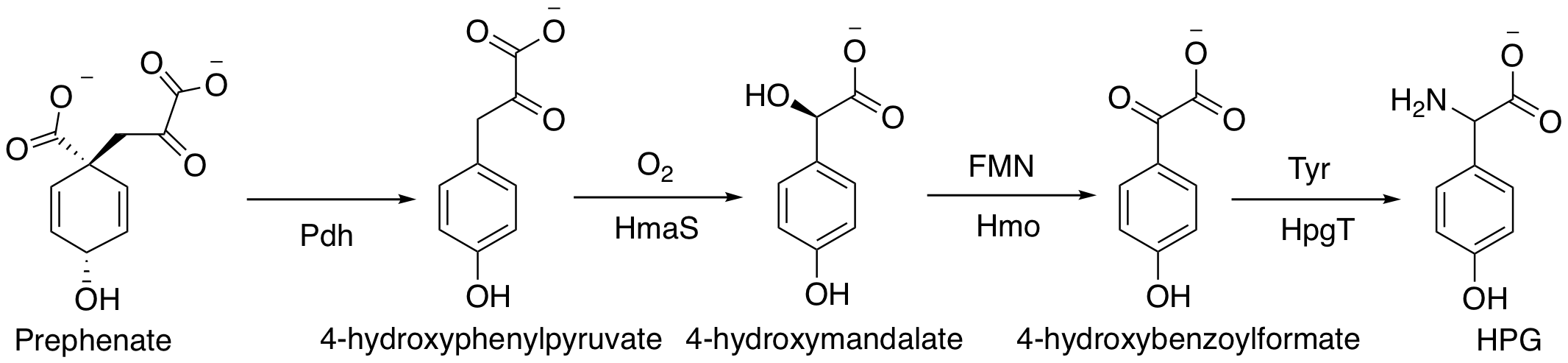
Biosynthesis of HPG

HPG is synthesized from prephenate, an intermediate in the shikimic acid pathway and also a precursor to tyrosine. Prephenate is aromatized by prephenate dehydrogenase (Pdh) using NAD^{+} as a cofactor to produce 4-hydroxyphenylpyruvate. 4-Hydroxyphenylpyruvate is then oxidized by 4-hydroxymandelate synthase (4HmaS) using oxygen to form 4-hydroxymandelate and hydrogen peroxide. 4HmaS is a non-heme iron-dependent dioxygenase. The reaction mechanism of this unique oxidation was proposed by Choroba et al in 2000

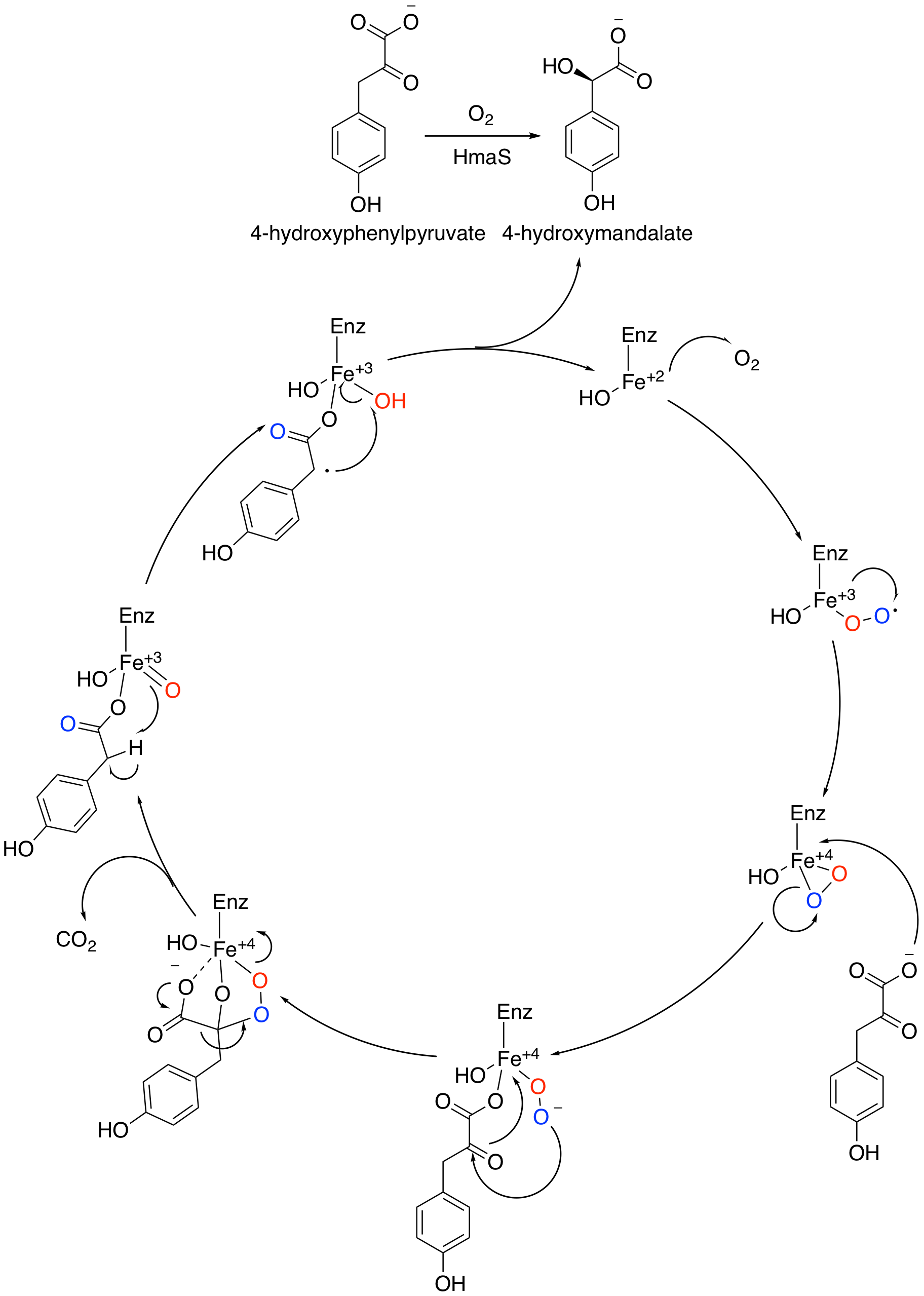
Proposed mechanism by Choroba et al for the oxidation of 4-hydroxymandelate.

4-Hydroxymandelate is subsequently oxidized by hydroxymandelate oxidase (Hmo) to 4-hydroxylbenzoylformate, using FMN as a cofactor. Finally, 4-hydroxyphenylglycine transaminase (HpgT) transfers an ammonia moiety from a donor to 4-hydroxylbenzoylformate to form HPG. Several different molecules can serve as the nitrogen donor for the transamination, however, Hubbard et al suspect L-tyrosine to serve as the most efficient donor. By doing so, the following cycle is constructed:

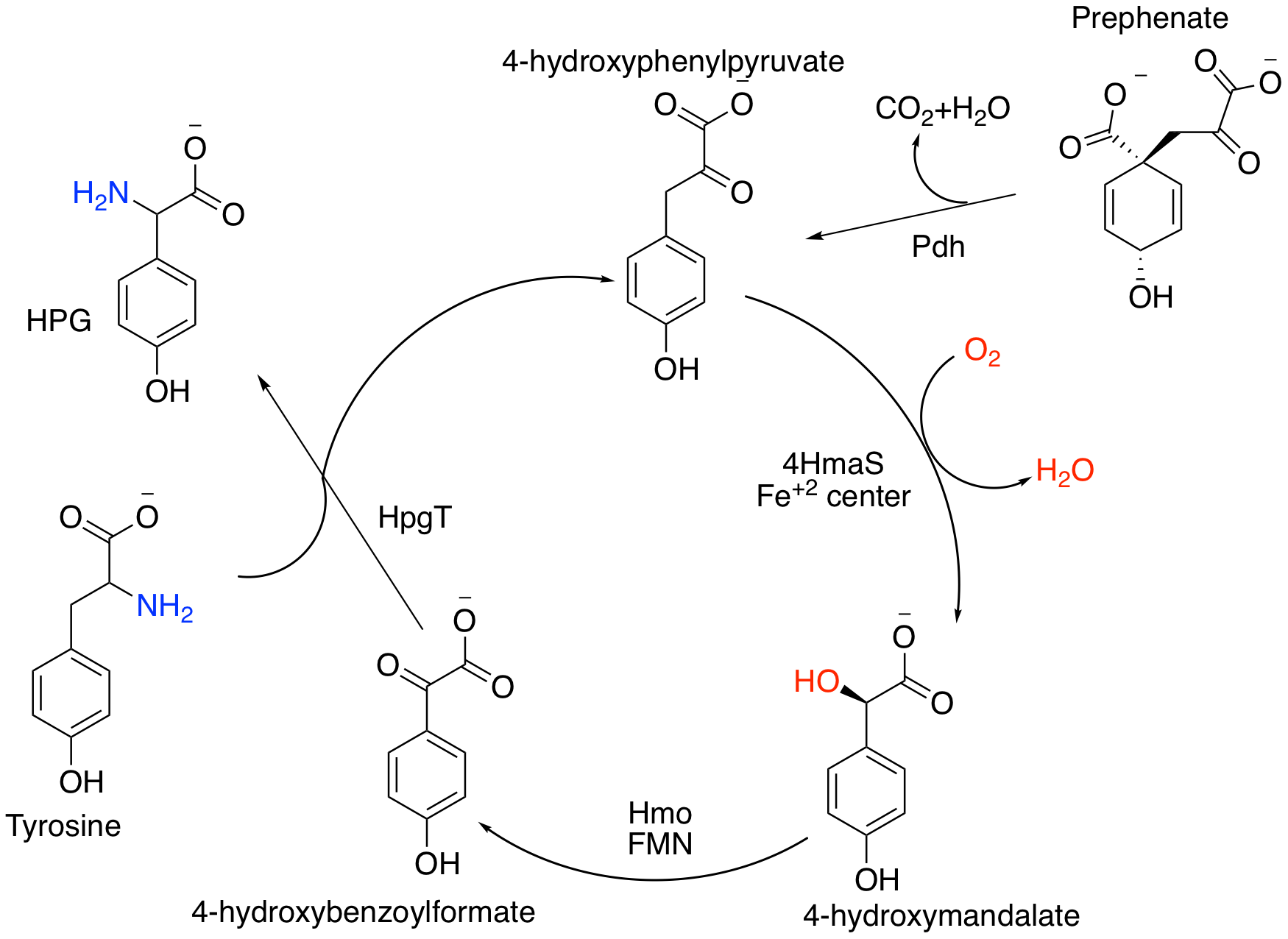
HPG synthetic cycle

HPG is also synthesized in Herpetosiphon aurantiacus using enzymes Haur_(1871,1887,1888).

== See also ==
- Vancomycin
- Oritavancin
- Glycopeptide antibiotics
