= 4-Hydroxybenzaldehyde =

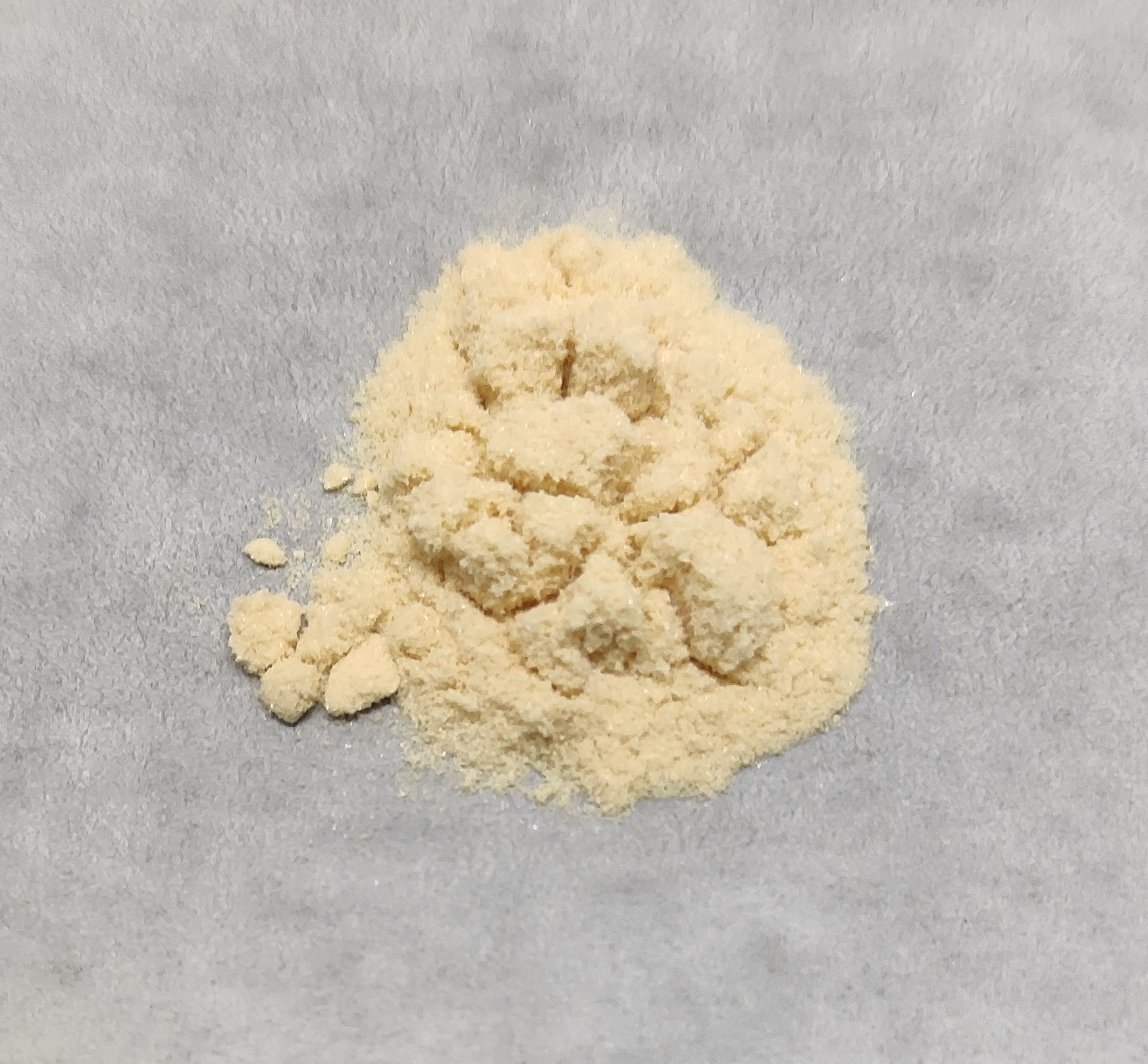

Names
- Preferred IUPAC name 4-Hydroxybenzaldehyde
- Other names p-Hydroxybenzaldehyde, 4-formylphenol

Identifiers
CAS Number	123-08-0
3D model (JSmol)	Interactive image
ChEBI	CHEBI:17597
ChEMBL	ChEMBL14193
ChemSpider	123
DrugBank	DB03560
ECHA InfoCard	100.004.182
KEGG	C00633
PubChem CID	126
UNII	O1738X3Y38
CompTox Dashboard (EPA)	DTXSID8059552
- InChI: InChI=1S/C7H6O2/c8-5-6-1-3-7(9)4-2-6/h1-5,9H Key: RGHHSNMVTDWUBI-UHFFFAOYSA-N; InChI=1/C7H6O2/c8-5-6-1-3-7(9)4-2-6/h1-5,9H Key: RGHHSNMVTDWUBI-UHFFFAOYAN
- SMILES: O=Cc1ccc(O)cc1

Properties
Chemical formula	C_{7}H_{6}O_{2}
Molar mass	122.123 g·mol^{−1}
Appearance	yellow to tan powder
Density	1.129 g/cm^{3} (130 °C)
Melting point	116 °C (241 °F; 389 K)
Boiling point	310 to 311 °C (590 to 592 °F; 583 to 584 K)
Solubility in water	12.9 g/L
Acidity (pK_{a})	7.61 (25 °C)
Magnetic susceptibility (χ)	−78.0·10^{−6} cm^{3}/mol
Refractive index (n_{D})	1.57051 (130 °C)
- Except where otherwise noted, data are given for materials in their standard state (at 25 °C [77 °F], 100 kPa). verify (what is ?) Infobox references

4‑Hydroxybenzaldehyde (para‑hydroxybenzaldehyde) is an organic compound with the formula C_{6}H_{4}OH(CHO). Along with 2-hydroxybenzaldehyde and 3-hydroxybenzaldehyde, it is one of the three isomers of hydroxybenzaldehyde.

== Synthesis, reactions, uses ==
4-Hydroxybenzaldehyde is prepared by reaction of phenol with chloroform, which gives isomeric hydroxybenzal chlorides. Hydrolysis of the C-Cl bonds gives the aldehyde.

4-Hydroxybenzaldehyde is a precursor to 4-hydroxyphenylglycine, which is itself a precursor to penicillins. In the Dakin oxidation, 4-hydroxybenzaldehyde reacts with hydrogen peroxide in base to form hydroquinone.

== Metabolism and occurrence ==
p-Hydroxybenzaldehyde dehydrogenase is an enzyme found in carrots (Daucus carota).

4-Hydroxybenzaldehyde is found in the orchids Gastrodia elata, Galeola faberi, and the Vanilla orchids.

== See also ==
- Salicylaldehyde (2-hydroxybenzaldehyde)

== Cited sources ==
- Haynes, William M., ed. (2016). CRC Handbook of Chemistry and Physics (97th ed.). CRC Press. ISBN 9781498754293.
