= 3,4-Dihydroxybenzaldehyde =

- Chemical structure of protocatechuic aldehyde

Names
- Preferred IUPAC name 3,4-Dihydroxybenzaldehyde
- Other names Protocatechuic aldehyde Protocatechualdehyde; Rancinamycin IV

Identifiers
CAS Number	139-85-5
3D model (JSmol)	Interactive image
Beilstein Reference	774381
ChEBI	CHEBI:50205
ChEMBL	ChEMBL222021
ChemSpider	8438
DrugBank	DB11268
ECHA InfoCard	100.004.889
EC Number	205-377-7
Gmelin Reference	123001
KEGG	C16700
PubChem CID	8768
UNII	4PVP2HCH4T
CompTox Dashboard (EPA)	DTXSID4074512
- InChI: InChI=1S/C7H6O3/c8-4-5-1-2-6(9)7(10)3-5/h1-4,9-10H Key: IBGBGRVKPALMCQ-UHFFFAOYSA-N; InChI=1/C7H6O3/c8-4-5-1-2-6(9)7(10)3-5/h1-4,9-10H Key: IBGBGRVKPALMCQ-UHFFFAOYAN
- SMILES: C1=CC(=C(C=C1C=O)O)O

Properties
Chemical formula	C_{7}H_{6}O_{3}
Molar mass	138.12 g/mol

Related compounds
Related compounds	2,4-Dihydroxybenzaldehyde
- Except where otherwise noted, data are given for materials in their standard state (at 25 °C [77 °F], 100 kPa). verify (what is ?) Infobox references

3,4-Dihydroxybenzaldehyde, also known as protocatechuic aldehyde, is a phenolic aldehyde, a compound released from cork stoppers into wine. It is an isomer of 2,4-dihydroxybenzaldehyde.

This molecule can be used as a precursor in the vanillin synthesis by biotransformation by cell cultures of Capsicum frutescens, a type of Chili pepper. It is also found in the mushroom Phellinus linteus.

== Pharmacological effects ==
Protocatechuic aldehyde regulates G protein-coupled estrogen receptor-1 (GPER-1) and exhibits protective effects in endothelial dysfunction and atherosclerosis.

== See also ==
- Phenolic compounds in wine
