= 2,4-Dihydroxybenzaldehyde =

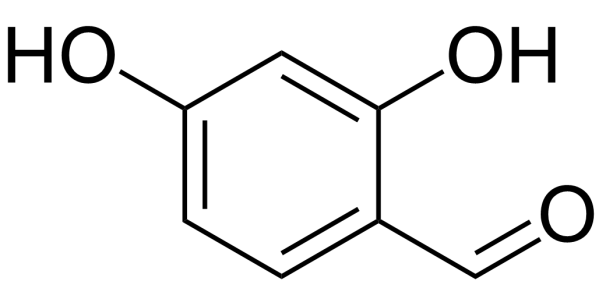

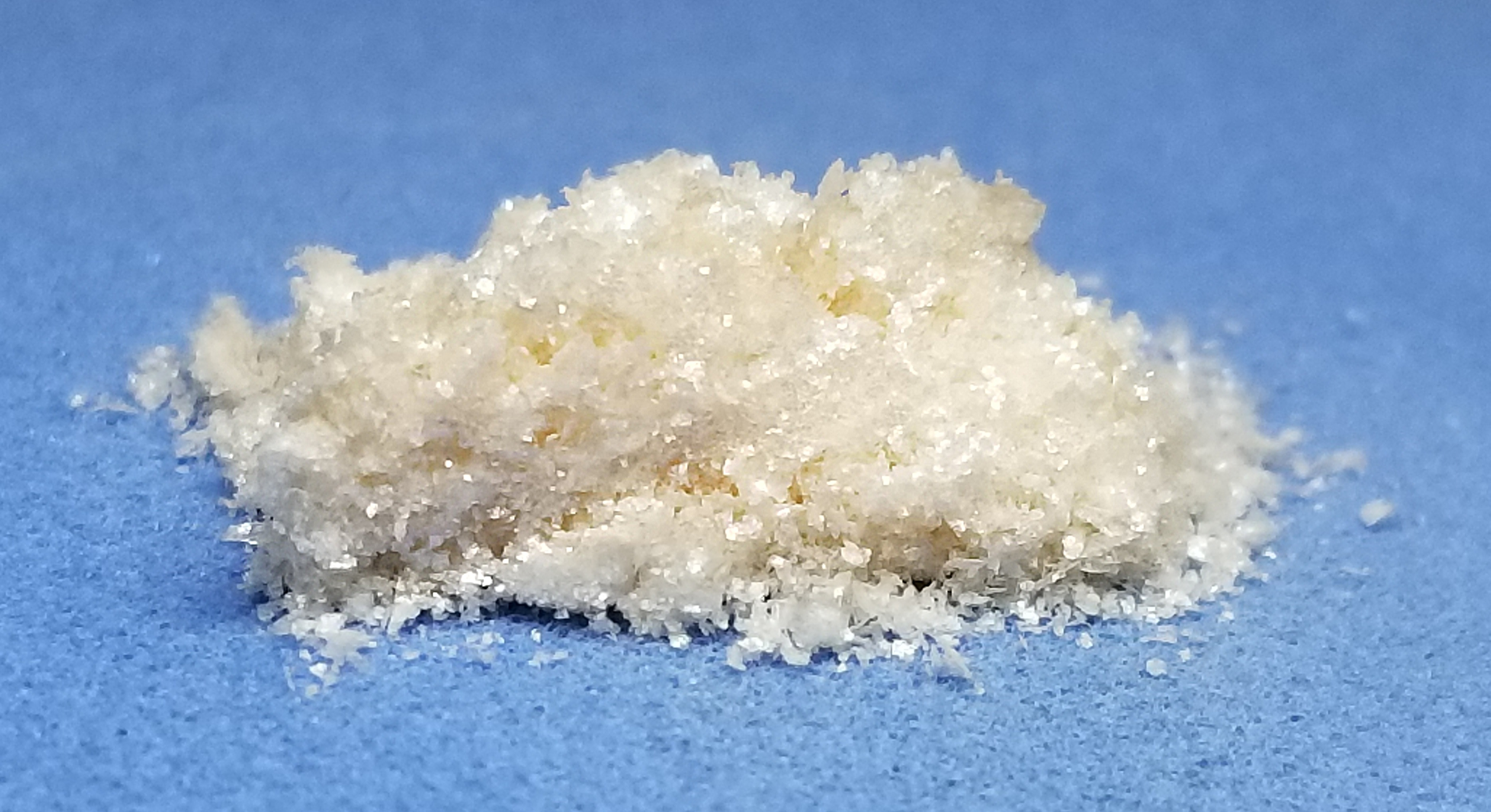

Names
- Preferred IUPAC name 2,4-Dihydroxybenzaldehyde
- Other names β-Resorcylaldehyde; 4-Formylresorcinol; 6-Formylresorcinol; 4-Hydroxysalicylaldehyde; 2,4-Dihydroxybenzenecarbonal; 2,4-Dihydroxybenzyl aldehyde

Identifiers
CAS Number	95-01-2
3D model (JSmol)	Interactive image
Beilstein Reference	878548
ChEBI	CHEBI:50198
ChEMBL	ChEMBL243587
ChemSpider	6943
ECHA InfoCard	100.002.167
EC Number	202-383-1
Gmelin Reference	218304
PubChem CID	7213
UNII	772JOF6LZS
CompTox Dashboard (EPA)	DTXSID8021806
- InChI: InChI=1S/C7H6O3/c8-4-5-1-2-6(9)3-7(5)10/h1-4,9-10H Key: IUNJCFABHJZSKB-UHFFFAOYSA-N; InChI=1/C7H6O3/c8-4-5-1-2-6(9)3-7(5)10/h1-4,9-10
- SMILES: C1=CC(=C(C=C1O)O)C=O

Properties
Chemical formula	C_{7}H_{6}O_{3}
Molar mass	138.12 g/mol
Melting point	135 °C (275 °F; 408 K)
Boiling point	226 °C (439 °F; 499 K)
Solubility in water	soluble

Hazards
- GHS labelling
Pictograms	(GHS07: Exclamation mark)
Signal word	Warning
Hazard statements	H302, H315, H319, H335
Precautionary statements	P261, P264, P264+P265, P270, P271, P280, P301+P317, P302+P352, P304+P340, P305+P351+P338, P319, P321, P330, P332+P317, P337+P317, P362+P364, P403+P233, P405, P501
- Except where otherwise noted, data are given for materials in their standard state (at 25 °C [77 °F], 100 kPa). verify (what is ?) Infobox references

2,4-Dihydroxybenzaldehyde or β-resorcylaldehyde is a phenolic aldehyde, a chemical compound with the formula C_{7}H_{6}O_{3}. It is an isomer of protocatechuic aldehyde (3,4-dihydroxybenzaldehyde).
