= Phenolic aldehyde =

Phenolic aldehydes are derivatives of phenol. Phenolic aldehydes can be found in wines and cognacs.

Examples :

- Hydroxybenzaldehydes
- Dihydroxybenzaldehydes
- Vanillin and isovanillin
- 2,3,4-trihydroxybenzaldehyde can be isolated from Antigonon leptopus.
