= List of progestogen esters =

Norethisterone acetate, a widely used progestogen ester and prodrug of norethisterone.

Medroxyprogesterone acetate, a progestogen ester that does not act as a prodrug.

This is a list of progestogen esters, or esters of progestogens.

Unlike the case of testosterone and estradiol, progesterone cannot be esterified as it lacks hydroxyl groups, so all progestogen esters, with the exception of esters of 17α-hydroxyprogesterone like hydroxyprogesterone caproate, are esters of progestins (synthetic progestogens) and are non-bioidentical. In addition, whereas all androgen and estrogen esters are prodrugs of the parent compound, only some and not all progestogen esters act as prodrugs. Esters of 17α-hydroxyprogesterone and 19-norprogesterone derivatives like hydroxyprogesterone caproate, medroxyprogesterone acetate, and nomegestrol acetate are active themselves and are not prodrugs, whereas esters of 19-nortestosterone derivatives like norethisterone acetate and norethisterone enanthate are not active themselves and are prodrugs.

== Esters of progesterone derivatives ==
=== Esters of 17α-hydroxyprogesterone derivatives ===
==== Marketed ====
The following major progestogen esters have been marketed:

- Chlormadinone acetate (Prostal, Belara)
- Cyproterone acetate (Androcur, Cyprostat, Diane, Diane-35)
- Hydroxyprogesterone caproate (Proluton, Proluton Depot, Makena; Delalutin)
- Medroxyprogesterone acetate (Depo-Provera, Provera)
- Megestrol acetate (Megace)

And the following minor progestogen esters have been marketed:

- Acetomepregenol (mepregenol diacete; Diamol)
- Anagestone acetate (Anatropin; ORF-1658)
- Chlormethenmadinone acetate (Biogest, Agelin)
- Flumedroxone acetate (Demigran, Leomigran; WG-537)
- Hydroxyprogesterone acetate (acetoxyprogesterone; Prodox)
- Hydroxyprogesterone heptanoate (H.O.P., Lutogil A.P., Lutogyl A.P.)
- Methenmadinone acetate (Superlutin, Antigest)
- Pentagestrone acetate (Gestovis, Gestovister)

The following veterinary-only progestogen esters have also been marketed:

- Delmadinone acetate (Tardak)
- Flugestone acetate (Chronogest, Chrono-Gest, Cronolone, Synchro-Mate, Gyncro-Mate; NSC-65411, SC-9880)
- Melengestrol acetate (Heifermax, MGA)
- Osaterone acetate (Ypozane; TZP-4238)

The corticosteroid ester mometasone furoate (Asmanex, Elocom, Elocon, Elosalic, Nasonex), which is a 17α-hydroxyprogesterone derivative, also has very potent progestogenic activity, though it is not used as a progestogen and is instead used exclusively as a corticosteroid.

==== Never marketed ====
- Bromethenmadinone acetate
- Butagest (buterol)
- Chlormadinone caproate
- Cismadinone acetate
- Clogestone acetate (chlormadinol acetate; AY-11440)
- Clomegestone acetate (clomagestone acetate; SH-741)
- Cymegesolate (megestrol acetate 3-cypionate; Progestin No. 1)
- Edogestrone (edogesterone; PH-218)
- Hydromadinone acetate (chloroacetoxyprogesterone; CAP; NSC-33170)
- Hydroxyprogesterone heptanoate benzilic acid hydrazone
- Medroxyprogesterone caproate
- Megestrol caproate
- Methenmadinone caproate (Lutofollin, in combination with estradiol valerate)

=== Esters of 19-norprogesterone derivatives ===
==== Marketed ====
The following progestogen esters have been marketed:

- Gestonorone caproate (gestronol hexanoate; Depostat, Primostat)
- Nomegestrol acetate (Lutenyl, Naemis, Zoely)
- Segesterone acetate (Nestorone, Elcometrine)

And the following veterinary-only progestogen esters have also been marketed:

- Norgestomet (norgestamet; Syncro-Mate B; SC-21009)

==== Never marketed ====
- Amadinone acetate (19-norchlormadinone acetate; RS-2208)
- Gestadienol acetate (CIBA-31458-Ba, CIBA-31458)
- Gestonorone acetate
- 18-Methylsegesterone acetate (18-methylnestorone)
- Oxogestone phenpropionate (xinogestone)

== Esters of testosterone derivatives ==
=== Esters of 19-nortestosterone derivatives ===
==== Marketed ====
The following progestogen esters have been marketed:

- Etynodiol diacetate (ethynodiol diacetate; Continuin, Femulen, Luteonorm, Luto-Metrodiol, Metrodiol)
- Norethisterone acetate (norethindrone acetate; Primolut-Nor, Norlestrin, Aygestin, Norlutate, Minovlar, Anovlar)
- Norethisterone enanthate (norethindrone enanthate; Noristerat, Norigest)
- Norgestimate (Ortho-Cyclen, Ortho Tri-Cyclen, Previfem, Sprintec, Prefest)
- Quingestanol acetate (Demovis, Pilomin, Riglovis, Unovis)

Many 19-nortestosterone androgen esters, such as nandrolone esters like nandrolone decanoate (Deca-Durabolin) and nandrolone phenpropionate (Durabolin), also have potent progestogenic activity.

==== Never marketed ====
- 6,6-Difluoronorethisterone acetate (6,6-difluoronorethindrone acetate)
- Levonorgestrel acetate (LNG-A)
- Levonorgestrel butanoate (LNG-B; HRP-002)
- Levonorgestrel cyclobutylcarboxylate (HRP-001)
- Levonorgestrel cyclopropylcarboxylate (HRP-003)
- Lynestrenol phenylpropionate
- Metynodiol diacetate (methynodiol diacetate; SC-19198)
- Norethisterone acetate oxime (norethindrone acetate oxime; ORF-5263, So-36)

== Other conjugates of progesterone derivatives ==
=== Ethers of progesterone derivatives ===
==== Marketed ====
Although not esters, the following progestogen ethers have been marketed:

- Pentagestrone acetate (17α-acetoxyprogesterone 3-cyclopentyl enol ether; Gestovis, Gestovister)
- Quingestrone (progesterone 3-cyclopentyl enol ether; PCPE; Enol-Luteovis; W-3399)

==== Never marketed ====
- Pentagestrone (17α-hydroxyprogesterone 3-cyclopentyl enol ether)
- Progesterone 3-acetyl enol ether (progesterone acetate)

=== Cyclic ketals of progesterone derivatives ===
==== Marketed ====
Although not esters, the following progestogen cyclic ketals (cyclic acetals) have been marketed:

- Algestone acetonide (dihydroxyprogesterone acetonide; 16α,17α-isopropylidenedioxyprogesterone; W-3395)
- Algestone acetophenide (dihydroxyprogesterone acetophenide; DHPA; Neolutin, Droxone, Deladroxone, Decadroxone, Dexadroxate, Bovitrol)
- Proligestone (14α,17α-propylidenedioxyprogesterone; 14α,17α-dihydroxyprogesterone cyclic acetal with propionaldehyde; Corvinan, Delvosteron)

=== Oximes of progesterone derivatives ===
==== Never marketed ====
Although not esters, the following progestogen oximes have not been marketed:

- EIDD-036 (progesterone 20-oxime; P4-20-O)
- EIDD-1723 (progesterone 20E-[O-[(phosphonooxy)methyl]oxime] sodium salt)
- P1-185 (progesterone 3-O-(L-valine)-E-oxime)
- Progesterone 3-oxime (P4-3-O)
- Progesterone carboxymethyloxime (progesterone 3-(O-carboxymethyl)oxime; P4-3-CMO)
- Progesterone dioxime (progesterone 3,20-dioxime; P4-3,20-DO)
- VOLT-02 (progesterone "conjugate"; chemical structure unreleased)

== Other conjugates of testosterone derivatives ==
=== Oximes of 19-nortestosterone derivatives ===
==== Marketed ====
Although not esters, the following progestogen oximes have been marketed:

- Norelgestromin (17α-ethynyl-18-methyl-19-nortestosterone 3-oxime)
- Norgestimate (17α-ethynyl-18-methyl-19-nortestosterone 3-oxime 17β-acetate)

==== Never marketed ====
- Norethisterone acetate oxime (17α-ethynyl-19-nortestosterone 3-oxime 17β-acetate)

== See also ==
- List of progestogens
- List of androgen esters
- List of estrogen esters
- List of corticosteroid esters
