= Progesterone oxime =

Progesterone oxime, or progesterone monoxime, is an oxime conjugate of progesterone and may refer to:

- Progesterone 3-oxime (3-(hydroxyimino)pregn-4-en-3-one)
- Progesterone 20-oxime (20-(hydroxyimino)pregn-4-en-3-one)

== See also ==
- Progesterone dioxime
- Progestogen ester § Progestogen oximes
- List of progestogen esters § Oximes of progesterone derivatives
- Progesterone (medication) § Derivatives
