= Bromethenmadinone acetate =

Chemical compound

Clinical data
- Other names: BMMA; Bromsuperlutin; 6-Bromo-16-methylene-17α-hydroxy-Δ^{6}-progesterone acetate; 6-Bromo-16-methylene-17α-acetoxypregna-4,6-diene-3,20-dione
- Drug class: Progestogen; Progestin; Progestogen ester

Identifiers
- IUPAC name: [(8R,9S,10R,13S,14S,17R)-17-Acetyl-6-bromo-10,13-dimethyl-16-methylidene-3-oxo-1,2,8,9,11,12,14,15-octahydrocyclopenta[a]phenanthren-17-yl] acetate
- CAS Number: 24431-75-2
- PubChem CID: 90679394
- ChemSpider: 34249907
- UNII: 3Z2W46W5HS
- ChEMBL: ChEMBL3276152

Chemical and physical data
- Formula: C_{24}H_{29}BrO_{4}
- Molar mass: 461.396 g·mol^{−1}
- 3D model (JSmol): Interactive image
- SMILES: CC(=O)[C@]1(C(=C)C[C@@H]2[C@@]1(CC[C@H]3[C@H]2C=C(C4=CC(=O)CC[C@]34C)Br)C)OC(=O)C
- InChI: InChI=1S/C24H29BrO4/c1-13-10-19-17-12-21(25)20-11-16(28)6-8-22(20,4)18(17)7-9-23(19,5)24(13,14(2)26)29-15(3)27/h11-12,17-19H,1,6-10H2,2-5H3/t17-,18+,19+,22-,23+,24+/m1/s1; Key:GIUDLKYATCHBDT-USYNNDFZSA-N

Bromethenmadinone acetate (BMMA, also known as bromsuperlutin) is a progestin medication which was developed in Czechoslovakia and was described in 1970 but was never marketed. Analogues of BMMA include chlormethenmadinone acetate, melengestrol acetate, and methenmadinone acetate.

== See also ==
- List of progestogen esters § Esters of 17α-hydroxyprogesterone derivatives
- 16-Methylene-17α-hydroxyprogesterone acetate
