= Butagest =

Chemical compound

Clinical data
- Other names: Buterol; 17α-Acetoxy-3β-butanoyloxy-6-methyl-pregna-4,6-dien-20-one; 17α-Acetoxy-6-methyl-20-oxopregna-4,6-dien-3β-yl butyrate; 6-Methyl-17α-hydroxy-δ^{6}-progesterone 3β-butanoate 17α-acetate
- Drug class: Progestogen; Progestogen ester

Identifiers
- IUPAC name: [(3S,8R,9S,10R,13S,14S,17R)-17-Acetyl-17-acetyloxy-6,10,13-trimethyl-1,2,3,8,9,11,12,14,15,16-decahydrocyclopenta[a]phenanthren-3-yl] butanoate
- CAS Number: 205993-31-3
- PubChem CID: 15816431
- ChemSpider: 21377535
- CompTox Dashboard (EPA): DTXSID201336951

Chemical and physical data
- Formula: C_{28}H_{40}O_{5}
- Molar mass: 456.623 g·mol^{−1}
- 3D model (JSmol): Interactive image
- SMILES: CCCC(=O)O[C@H]1CC[C@@]2([C@H]3CC[C@]4([C@H]([C@@H]3C=C(C2=C1)C)CC[C@@]4(C(=O)C)OC(=O)C)C)C
- InChI: InChI=1S/C28H40O5/c1-7-8-25(31)32-20-9-12-26(5)22-10-13-27(6)23(21(22)15-17(2)24(26)16-20)11-14-28(27,18(3)29)33-19(4)30/h15-16,20-23H,7-14H2,1-6H3/t20-,21+,22-,23-,26+,27-,28-/m0/s1; Key:VWKIFEBMJRFARL-NAEKRLSBSA-N

Butagest, also known as buterol, is a modification of megestrol acetate in which the C-3 ketone has been replaced by a C3β butanoyloxy moeity. It is chemically known as 3β-hydroxy-6-methyl-17α-hydroxypregna-4,6-dien-20-one 3β-butanoate 17α-acetate or 6-methyl-17α-hydroxy-δ^{6}-progesterone 3β-butanoate 17α-acetate and is a steroidal progestin which was developed in Russia for potential clinical use as a progesterone supplement primarily for hormone replacement therapy but it was never marketed for reasons which are still unclear.

== Pharmacology ==
Butagest is a synthetic progestin that mimics the physiological actions of natural progesterone. It is used in various therapeutic contexts, including hormone replacement therapy, fertility treatments, and menstrual irregularities.

=== Mechanism of action ===
Butagest acts as an agonist at progesterone receptors in various tissues. Its primary actions include:

- Promoting endometrial secretory changes to support embryo implantation and pregnancy.
- Suppressing the hypothalamic-pituitary-gonadal axis to prevent ovulation.
- Modulating the immune response to maintain a pregnancy-friendly environment.

By stabilizing the endometrium, it prevents abnormal uterine bleeding and aids in maintaining hormonal balance during assisted reproductive therapies.

== Pharmacokinetics ==
- Absorption: Butagest is efficiently absorbed following oral or vaginal administration, with its bioavailability dependent on the route of administration.
- Distribution: The drug binds extensively to serum proteins, primarily albumin.
- Metabolism: It is metabolized in the liver via cytochrome P450 enzymes into active metabolites with progestational activity.
- Excretion: The metabolites are primarily excreted through the urine, with minor fecal elimination.

== Adverse effects ==
The use of butagest, which contains progesterone, is associated with several adverse effects. These vary depending on the dose, route of administration, and individual susceptibility.

== Common adverse effects ==
=== Gastrointestinal ===
- Nausea
- Vomiting
- Constipation or diarrhea

=== Neurological ===
- Headache
- Dizziness
- Fatigue

=== Breasts ===
- Tenderness
- Swelling

=== Mood and behavioral ===
- Mood swings
- Irritability
- Depression or anxiety

=== Skin ===
- Acne
- Rash or itching (rare)

=== Reproductive ===
- Irregular menstrual bleeding
- Spotting

=== Serious adverse effects ===
These effects require immediate medical attention:

=== Cardiovascular ===
- Blood clots (thromboembolism)
- Stroke
- Hypertension

=== Hepatic ===
- Jaundice
- Elevated liver enzymes

=== Endocrine and metabolic ===
- Weight gain
- Fluid retention

=== Neurological ===
- Severe headaches
- Visual disturbances (potential sign of thrombosis)

=== Allergic reactions ===
- Anaphylaxis (rare)
- Angioedema

=== Cancer risks ===
- Increased risk of hormone-sensitive cancers, such as breast and ovarian cancers, especially with combined hormone therapy.

=== Precautions ===
Butagest should be used cautiously in patients with a history of:

- Thromboembolic disorders
- Hormone-sensitive cancers
- Severe liver disease

Regular monitoring is recommended for those with:

- Cardiovascular risks
- Migraines
- Diabetes

== Toxicology ==
The toxicology of progesterone, the active ingredient in butagest, has been studied extensively. Below are key findings:

=== Acute toxicity ===
Progesterone exhibits low acute toxicity. Overdose typically results in mild symptoms such as nausea and dizziness, without life-threatening effects.

=== Chronic toxicity ===
Long-term high-dose use may increase the risk of thromboembolic disorders, cardiovascular diseases, and hormone-sensitive cancers such as breast cancer.

=== Carcinogenicity ===
Progesterone is classified by the International Agency for Research on Cancer (IARC) as possibly carcinogenic to humans (Group 2B).

=== Environmental toxicity ===
Improper disposal of progesterone can disrupt aquatic ecosystems, as it is an endocrine-disrupting compound.

== See also ==
- Acetomepregenol
- Clogestone
- Clogestone acetate
- Mecigestone
- List of Russian drugs
