= C22H30O4 =

The molecular formula C_{22}H_{30}O_{4} (molar mass: 358.47 g/mol) may refer to:

- Bolinaquinone
- Canrenoic acid
- Cannabidiolic acid
- Cannabichromenic acid
- Gestonorone acetate, or gestronol acetate
- Ilimaquinone
- Tetrahydrocannabinolic acid
