= C21H29ClO3 =

The molecular formula C_{21}H_{29}ClO_{3} (molar mass: 364.90616 g/mol) may refer to:

- Clogestone, or chlormadinol
- Clostebol acetate
- Hydromadinone
