= Pentarane =

Pentarane, or pentaran, may refer to:

- Pentarane A (D'6-pentarane)
- Pentarane B (mecigestone)
