= Hydromadinone acetate =

Chemical compound

Clinical data
- Other names: NSC-33170; Chloroacetoxyprogesterone; CAP; 6α-Chloro-17α-acetoxyprogesterone; 6α-Chloro-17α-acetoxypregn-4-ene-3,20-dione
- Drug class: Progestogen; Progestogen ester

Identifiers
- IUPAC name: [(6S,8R,9S,10R,13S,14S,17R)-17-Acetyl-6-chloro-10,13-dimethyl-3-oxo-2,6,7,8,9,11,12,14,15,16-decahydro-1H-cyclopenta[a]phenanthren-17-yl] acetate
- CAS Number: 2477-73-8
- PubChem CID: 200665
- ChemSpider: 173710
- UNII: X8WV0125VZ
- CompTox Dashboard (EPA): DTXSID901226145
- ECHA InfoCard: 100.124.835

Chemical and physical data
- Formula: C_{23}H_{31}ClO_{4}
- Molar mass: 406.95 g·mol^{−1}
- 3D model (JSmol): Interactive image
- SMILES: CC(=O)[C@]1(CC[C@@H]2[C@@]1(CC[C@H]3[C@H]2C[C@@H](C4=CC(=O)CC[C@]34C)Cl)C)OC(=O)C
- InChI: InChI=1S/C23H31ClO4/c1-13(25)23(28-14(2)26)10-7-18-16-12-20(24)19-11-15(27)5-8-21(19,3)17(16)6-9-22(18,23)4/h11,16-18,20H,5-10,12H2,1-4H3/t16-,17+,18+,20+,21-,22+,23+/m1/s1; Key:DCVGANSDLNPXGO-WXLIAARGSA-N

Hydromadinone acetate (developmental code name NSC-33170), also known as chloroacetoxyprogesterone (CAP), as well as 6α-chloro-17α-acetoxyprogesterone or 6α-chloro-17α-acetoxypregn-4-ene-3,20-dione, is a steroidal progestin of the 17α-hydroxyprogesterone group that was never marketed. It is the C17α acetate ester of hydromadinone, which, similarly, was never marketed.

== See also ==
- List of progestogens
- List of progestogen esters
