= List of progestogens =

Progesterone.

Steroid ring system.

This is a list of progestogens that are or that have been used in clinical or veterinary medicine. They are steroids and include derivatives of progesterone and testosterone.

== Progesterone derivatives ==
Compound	Chemical name	Structure
Progesterone	Pregn-4-ene-3,20-dione	
Quingestrone	Progesterone 3-cyclopentyl enol ether	

=== Retroprogesterone derivatives ===
Compound	Chemical name	Structure
Retroprogesterone	9β,10α-Progesterone	
Dydrogesterone	6-Dehydro-9β,10α-progesterone	
Trengestone	6-Chloro-1,6-didehydro-9β,10α-progesterone	

Although an active progestogen, retroprogesterone is not medically used.

=== 17α-Hydroxyprogesterone derivatives ===
Compound	Chemical name	Structure
Hydroxyprogesterone	17α-Hydroxyprogesterone	
Acetomepregenol (mepregenol diacetate)	3β,17α-Diacetoxy-6-methyl-6-dehydro-3-deketoprogesterone	
Algestone	16α,17α-Dihydroxyprogesterone	
Algestone acetophenide	16α,17α-Dihydroxyprogesterone acetophenide	
Anagestone acetate	17α-Acetoxy-6α-methyl-3-deketoprogesterone	
Chlormadinone acetate	17α-Acetoxy-6-chloro-6-dehydroprogesterone	
Chlormethenmadinone acetate	17α-Acetoxy-6-chloro-16-methylene-6-dehydroprogesterone	
Cyproterone acetate	17α-Acetoxy-1,2α-methylene-6-chloro-6-dehydroprogesterone	
Delmadinone acetate	17α-Acetoxy-6-chloro-1,6-didehydro-progesterone	
Flugestone acetate (flurogestone acetate)	17α-Acetoxy-9α-fluoro-11β-hydroxyprogesterone	
Flumedroxone acetate	17α-Acetoxy-6α-(trifluoromethyl)progesterone	
Hydroxyprogesterone acetate	17α-Acetoxyprogesterone	
Hydroxyprogesterone caproate	17α-Hexanoxyprogesterone	
Hydroxyprogesterone heptanoate	17α-Heptanoxyprogesterone	
Medroxyprogesterone acetate	17α-Acetoxy-6α-methylprogesterone	
Megestrol acetate	17α-Acetoxy-6-methyl-6-dehydroprogesterone	
Melengestrol acetate	17α-Acetoxy-16-methylene-6-methyl-6-dehydroprogesterone	
Methenmadinone acetate	17α-Acetoxy-16-methylene-6-dehydroprogesterone	
Osaterone acetate	17α-Acetoxy-6-chloro-2-oxa-6-dehydroprogesterone	
Pentagestrone acetate	17α-Acetoxyprogesterone 3-cyclopentyl enol ether	

17α-hydroxyprogesterone is inactive as a progestogen and is not used medically.

The 19-norprogesterone derivatives gestonorone caproate (gestronol hexanoate), nomegestrol acetate, segesterone acetate (nestorone, elcometrine), and norgestomet are also derivatives of 17α-hydroxyprogesterone (see below).

=== 17α-Methylprogesterone derivatives ===
Compound	Chemical name	Structure
17α-Methylprogesterone	17α-Methylprogesterone	
Medrogestone	6,17α-Dimethyl-6-dehydroprogesterone	

Although an active progestogen, 17α-methylprogesterone is not medically used.

The 19-norprogesterone derivatives demegestone, promegestone, and trimegestone are also derivatives of 17α-methylprogesterone (see below).

=== Other 17α-substituted progesterone derivatives ===
Compound	Chemical name	Structure
Haloprogesterone	6α-Fluoro-17α-bromoprogesterone	
Proligestone	14α,17α-Propylidenedioxyprogesterone	

=== 19-Norprogesterone derivatives ===
Compound	Chemical name	Structure
19-Norprogesterone	19-Norprogesterone	
Demegestone	17α-Methyl-9-dehydro-19-norprogesterone	
Gestonorone caproate (gestronol hexanoate)	17α-Caproxy-19-norprogesterone	
Nomegestrol acetate	17α-Acetoxy-6-methyl-6-dehydro-19-norprogesterone	
Norgestomet	17α-Acetoxy-11β-methyl-19-norprogesterone	
Promegestone	17α,21-Dimethyl-9-dehydro-19-norprogesterone	
Segesterone acetate (nestorone, elcometrine)	17α-Acetoxy-16-methylene-19-norprogesterone	
Trimegestone	21β-Hydroxy-17α,21-dimethyl-9-dehydro-19-norprogesterone	

Although an active progestogen, 19-norprogesterone is not medically used.

== Testosterone derivatives ==
Compound	Chemical name(s)	Structure
Testosterone	17β-Deacetyl-17β-hydroxyprogesterone; Androst-4-en-17β-ol-3-one	

Testosterone itself does not have significant progestogenic activity. Testosterone is instead classified as an anabolic-androgenic steroid and is included here purely because it is the parent structure of this group of progestins.

=== 17α-Ethynyltestosterone derivatives ===
Compound	Chemical name(s)	Structure
Ethisterone (ethinyltestosterone)	17α-Ethynyltestosterone	
Danazol (2,3-isoxazolethisterone)	2,3-Isoxazol-17α-ethynyltestosterone^{?}	
Dimethisterone	6α,21-Dimethyl-17α-ethynyltestosterone	

=== 19-Nortestosterone derivatives ===
Compound	Chemical name(s)	Structure
Nandrolone (nortestosterone)	19-Nortestosterone	
Oxendolone (TSAA-291)	16β-Ethyl-19-nortestosterone	

While nandrolone (19-nortestosterone) does have significant progestogenic activity, it is not used as a progestogen. It is instead classified as an androgenic-anabolic steroid and is included here purely because it is an important parent structure of this group of progestins.

=== 17α-Ethynyl-19-nortestosterone derivatives ===
==== Estranes ====
Compound	Chemical name(s)	Structure
Norethisterone (norethindrone)	17α-Ethynyl-19-nortestosterone	
Etynodiol diacetate (ethynodiol diacetate)	17α-Ethynyl-3-deketo-3β-hydroxy-19-nortestosterone 3β,17β-diacetate	
Lynestrenol (3-deketonorethisterone)	17α-Ethynyl-3-deketo-19-nortestosterone	
Norethisterone acetate (norethindrone acetate)	17α-Ethynyl-19-nortestosterone 17β-acetate	
Norethisterone enanthate (norethindrone enanthate)	17α-Ethynyl-19-nortestosterone 17β-enanthate	
Noretynodrel (norethynodrel)	17α-Ethynyl-δ^{5(10)}-19-nortestosterone	
Norgestrienone (ethinyltrenbolone)	17α-Ethynyl-19-nor-δ^{9,11}-testosterone	
Quingestanol acetate	4-Hydro-17α-ethynyl-19-nor-δ^{3,5}-testosterone 3-cyclopentyl ether 17β-acetate^{?}	
Tibolone (7α-methylnoretynodrel)	7α-Methyl-17α-ethynyl-19-nor-δ^{5(10)}-testosterone	

==== 18-Methylestranes (13β-ethylgonanes) ====
Compound	Chemical name(s)	Structure
Desogestrel	3-Deketo-11-methylene-17α-ethynyl-18-methyl-19-nortestosterone	
Etonogestrel (3-ketodesogestrel)	11-Methylene-17α-ethynyl-18-methyl-19-nortestosterone	
Gestodene (15-dehydronorgestrel)	17α-Ethynyl-18-methyl-19-nor-δ^{15}-testosterone	
Gestrinone (ethylnorgestrienone, R-2323)	17α-Ethynyl-18-methyl-19-nor-δ^{9,11}-testosterone	
Levonorgestrel	17α-Ethynyl-18-methyl-19-nortestosterone	
Norelgestromin (17β-deacetylnorgestimate, norgestrel 3-oxime)	17α-Ethynyl-18-methyl-19-nortestosterone 3-oxime	
Norgestimate	17α-Ethynyl-18-methyl-19-nortestosterone 3-oxime 17β-acetate	
Norgestrel (13-methylnorethisterone)	rac-13-Ethyl-17α-ethynyl-19-nortestosterone	

=== Other 17α-substituted 19-nortestosterone derivatives ===
Compound	Chemical name(s)	Structure
Allylestrenol (allyloestrenol)	3-Deketo-17α-allyl-19-nortestosterone	
Altrenogest (allyltrenbolone, allyltrienolone)	17α-Allyl-19-nor-δ^{9,11}-testosterone	
Dienogest	17α-Cyanomethyl-19-nor-δ^{9}-testosterone	
Normethandrone (methylestrenolone, normethandrolone, normethisterone, methylnortestosterone)	17α-Methyl-19-nortestosterone	
Norvinisterone (vinylnortestosterone, SC-4641)	17α-Vinyl-19-nortestosterone	
Norgesterone (norvinodrel, vinylestrenolone, vinylnoretynodrel)	17α-Vinyl-δ^{5(10)}-19-nortestosterone	

== Spirolactone derivatives ==
Compound	Chemical name(s)	Structure
SC-5233 (spirolactone)	17α-(2-Carboxyethyl)testosterone γ-lactone	
Drospirenone	6β,7β:15β,16β-Dimethylenespirolactone	

Although an active progestogen, SC-5233 (spirolactone) is not medically used.

== See also ==
- List of steroids
- List of progestogen esters

== Notes ==
^{?} = Chemical names that are unverified.
