= C25H36O2 =

The molecular formula C_{25}H_{36}O_{2} may refer to:

- AMG-41, an analgesic drug
- Pentarane A, a steroidal progestin
- Variecolin, a bio-active ascomycete isolate.
