= Clogestone =

Chemical compound

Clinical data
- Other names: Chlormadinol

Identifiers
- IUPAC name: 1-[(1S,2R,5S,10R,11S,14R,15S)-8-chloro-5,14-dihydroxy-2,15-dimethyltetracyclo[8.7.0.0^{2,7}.0^{11,15}]heptadeca-6,8-dien-14-yl]ethan-1-one
- CAS Number: 20047-75-0
- PubChem CID: 20055454
- ChemSpider: 16736893
- UNII: 0I88K7V2TF
- CompTox Dashboard (EPA): DTXSID60173865

Chemical and physical data
- Formula: C_{21}H_{29}ClO_{3}
- Molar mass: 364.91 g·mol^{−1}
- 3D model (JSmol): Interactive image
- SMILES: CC(=O)C1(CCC2C1(CCC3C2C=C(C4=CC(CCC34C)O)Cl)C)O
- InChI: InChI=1S/C21H29ClO3/c1-12(23)21(25)9-6-16-14-11-18(22)17-10-13(24)4-7-19(17,2)15(14)5-8-20(16,21)3/h10-11,13-16,24-25H,4-9H2,1-3H3/t13-,14+,15-,16-,19+,20-,21-/m0/s1; Key:WZTUZRFSDWXDRM-IAGOJMRCSA-N

Clogestone (INN, BAN), also known as chlormadinol or as 3β,17α-dihydroxy-6-chloropregna-4,6-diene-20-one, is a steroidal progestin that was synthesized in 1964 and was investigated as a progestin-only contraceptive but was never marketed. A diacetate ester, clogestone acetate, also exists and similarly was never marketed.

== See also ==
- Acetomepregenol
- Butagest
- Mecigestone
