= C28H40O4 =

The molecular formula C_{28}H_{40}O_{4} (molar mass: 440.615 g/mol, exact mass: 440.2927 u) may refer to:

- Megestrol caproate (MGC)
- Pentagestrone acetate (PGA)
