= Levonorgestrel cyclobutylcarboxylate =

Chemical compound

Clinical data
- Other names: HRP-001; HRP001; Levonorgestrel cyclobutyl-carboxylate; Levonorgestrel cyclobutanecarboxylate; Levonorgestrel 17β-cyclobutylcarboxylate; 17α-Ethynyl-18-methyl-19-nortestosterone 17β-cyclobutylcarboxylate; 17α-Ethynyl-18-methylestr-4-en-17β-ol-3-one 17β-cyclobutylcarboxylate; 13-Ethyl-17α-hydroxy-18,19-dinorpregn-4-en-20-yn-3-one cyclobutanecarboxylate
- Routes of administration: Intramuscular injection
- Drug class: Progestogen; Progestin; Progestogen ester

Identifiers
- IUPAC name: [(8R,9S,10R,13S,14S,17R)-13-Ethyl-17-ethynyl-3-oxo-1,2,6,7,8,9,10,11,12,14,15,16-dodecahydrocyclopenta[a]phenanthren-17-yl] cyclobutanecarboxylate
- CAS Number: 86679-36-9
- PubChem CID: 10092040
- ChemSpider: 21165289
- CompTox Dashboard (EPA): DTXSID00235759
- ECHA InfoCard: 100.081.126

Chemical and physical data
- Formula: C_{26}H_{34}O_{3}
- Molar mass: 394.555 g·mol^{−1}
- 3D model (JSmol): Interactive image
- SMILES: CC[C@]12CC[C@H]3[C@H]([C@@H]1CC[C@]2(C#C)OC(=O)C4CCC4)CCC5=CC(=O)CC[C@H]35
- InChI: InChI=1S/C26H34O3/c1-3-25-14-12-21-20-11-9-19(27)16-18(20)8-10-22(21)23(25)13-15-26(25,4-2)29-24(28)17-6-5-7-17/h2,16-17,20-23H,3,5-15H2,1H3/t20-,21+,22+,23-,25-,26-/m0/s1; Key:WWGTWFPUIPEHNX-UKNJCJGYSA-N

Levonorgestrel cyclobutylcarboxylate (or levonorgestrel 17β-cyclobutylcarboxylate; developmental code name HRP-001) is a progestin and a progestogen ester which was studied for potential use as an injectable hormonal contraceptive but was never marketed. It was developed by the World Health Organization's Special Programme on Human Reproduction in the 1980s. Analogues of levonorgestrel cyclobutylcarboxylate include levonorgestrel butanoate (HRP-002) and levonorgestrel cyclopropylcarboxylate (HRP-003).

== See also ==
- List of progestogen esters § Esters of 19-nortestosterone derivatives
- Progestogen-only injectable contraceptive
