= C22H28O2 =

The molecular formula C_{22}H_{28}O_{2} may refer to:

- Etonogestrel, a progestin medication used as birth control for women
- Methenmadinone, a pregnane steroid which was never marketed
