= Norethisterone acetate oxime =

Chemical compound

Clinical data
- Other names: Norethindrone acetate oxime; ORF-5263; So-36; Norethisterone-3-oxime acetate; 17α-Ethynyl-19-nortestosterone 3-oxime 17β-acetate
- Routes of administration: By mouth
- Drug class: Progestogen; Progestogen ester

Identifiers
- IUPAC name: (1S,2R,5E,10R,11S,14R,15S)-14-ethynyl-5-(hydroxyimino)-15-methyltetracyclo[8.7.0.0^{2,7}.0^{11,15}]heptadec-6-en-14-yl acetate
- CAS Number: 20799-24-0
- PubChem CID: 91758682
- UNII: VFK4D40PMQ

Chemical and physical data
- Formula: C_{22}H_{29}NO_{3}
- Molar mass: 355.478 g·mol^{−1}
- 3D model (JSmol): Interactive image
- SMILES: CC(=O)O[C@]1(CC[C@@H]2[C@@]1(CC[C@H]3[C@H]2CCC4=C/C(=N/O)/CC[C@H]34)C)C#C
- InChI: InChI=1S/C22H29NO3/c1-4-22(26-14(2)24)12-10-20-19-7-5-15-13-16(23-25)6-8-17(15)18(19)9-11-21(20,22)3/h1,13,17-20,25H,5-12H2,2-3H3/b23-16+/t17-,18+,19+,20-,21-,22-/m0/s1; Key:SCTDPGXGNWEFNF-LQRGBYOBSA-N

Norethisterone acetate oxime (developmental code names ORF-5263, So-36), or norethindrone acetate oxime, is a steroidal progestin of the 19-nortestosterone group which was developed as a postcoital contraceptive but was never marketed. It is the C3 oxime and C17β-acetate ester of norethisterone.

== See also ==
- List of progestogens
- List of progestogen esters
