= 6,6-Difluoronorethisterone acetate =

Chemical compound

Clinical data
- Other names: 6,6-Difluoro-17α-ethynyl-19-nortestosterone 17β-acetate; 6,6-Difluoro-17α-ethynylestr-4-en-17β-ol-3-one 17β-acetate
- Drug class: Progestogen; Progestogen ester

Identifiers
- IUPAC name: (1S,2R,10R,11S,14S,15S)-14-Ethynyl-8,8-difluoro-15-methyl-5-oxotetracyclo[8.7.0.0^{2,7}.0^{11,15}]heptadec-6-en-14-yl acetate
- CAS Number: 27189-18-0
- ChemSpider: 129864936
- UNII: WSB66DWM5B

Chemical and physical data
- Formula: C_{22}H_{26}F_{2}O_{3}
- Molar mass: 376.444 g·mol^{−1}
- 3D model (JSmol): Interactive image
- SMILES: CC(=O)O[C@@]1(CC[C@H]2[C@@H]3CC(F)(F)C4=CC(=O)CC[C@@H]4[C@H]3CC[C@]12C)C#C
- InChI: InChI=1S/C22H26F2O3/c1-4-21(27-13(2)25)10-8-18-17-12-22(23,24)19-11-14(26)5-6-16(19)15(17)7-9-20(18,21)3/h1,11,15-18H,5-10,12H2,2-3H3/t15-,16-,17-,18+,20?,21-/m1/s1; Key:BPHXPNIAOQRMIY-QHGTWEGNSA-N

6,6-Difluoronorethisterone acetate, also known as 6,6-difluoro-17α-ethynyl-19-nortestosterone 17β-acetate or as 6,6-difluoro-17α-ethynylestr-4-en-17β-ol-3-one 17β-acetate, is a steroidal progestin of the 19-nortestosterone group which was never marketed. In comparison to other steroids, is the C17β acetate ester of 6,6-difluoronorethisterone and the 6,6-difluoro analog of norethisterone acetate.

== See also ==
- List of progestogen esters
