= C23H29ClO4 =

The molecular formula C_{23}H_{29}ClO_{4} (molar mass: 404.93 g/mol, exact mass: 404.1754 u) may refer to:

- Chlormadinone acetate (CMA)
- Cismadinone acetate
