= C25H34O4 =

The molecular formula C_{25}H_{34}O_{4} may refer to:

- Cannabidiol diacetate
- Metynodiol diacetate
