= Amadinone acetate =

Chemical compound

Clinical data
- Other names: RS-2208; 19-Norchlormadinone acetate; 6-Chloro-17α-acetoxy-19-norpregna-4,6-diene-3,20-dione
- Drug class: Progestogen; Progestogen ester

Identifiers
- IUPAC name: [(8R,9S,10R,13S,14S,17R)-17-acetyl-6-chloro-13-methyl-3-oxo-1,2,8,9,10,11,12,14,15,16-decahydrocyclopenta[a]phenanthren-17-yl] acetate
- CAS Number: 22304-34-3
- PubChem CID: 9977739
- ChemSpider: 8153331
- UNII: 3E13526FYB
- KEGG: D02881
- ChEMBL: ChEMBL2104011
- CompTox Dashboard (EPA): DTXSID90176849

Chemical and physical data
- Formula: C_{22}H_{27}ClO_{4}
- Molar mass: 390.90 g·mol^{−1}
- 3D model (JSmol): Interactive image
- SMILES: CC(=O)[C@]1(CC[C@@H]2[C@@]1(CC[C@H]3[C@H]2C=C(C4=CC(=O)CC[C@H]34)Cl)C)OC(=O)C
- InChI: InChI=1S/C22H27ClO4/c1-12(24)22(27-13(2)25)9-7-19-17-11-20(23)18-10-14(26)4-5-15(18)16(17)6-8-21(19,22)3/h10-11,15-17,19H,4-9H2,1-3H3/t15-,16-,17-,19+,21+,22+/m1/s1; Key:PSJMYDLEWUWIAN-KYPKCDLESA-N

Amadinone acetate (USAN) (developmental code name RS-2208), also known as 19-norchlormadinone acetate, is a steroidal progestin of the 19-norprogesterone and 17α-hydroxyprogesterone groups that was never marketed. It is the acetate ester of amadinone, which, similarly, was never marketed.

== See also ==
- Chlormadinone acetate
- List of progestogen esters
