= C21H27ClO3 =

The molecular formula C_{21}H_{27}ClO_{3} (molar mass: 362.89028 g/mol, exact mass: 362.1649 u) may refer to:

- Chlormadinone
- Cismadinone, also known as 6α-chloro-17α-hydroxypregna-1,4-diene-3,20-dione
