= C24H29ClO4 =

The molecular formula C_{24}H_{29}ClO_{4} may refer to:

- Chlormethenmadinone acetate, a progestin medication developed in Czechoslovakia in the 1960s
- Cyproterone acetate, among others, is an antiandrogen and progestin medication
