= Progesterone 3-oxime =

Chemical compound

Clinical data
- Other names: Progesterone 3-oxime; P4-3-O; Pregn-4-ene-3,20-dione 3-oxime; 20-(Hydroxyimino)pregn-4-en-3-one

Identifiers
- IUPAC name: 1-((8S,9S,10R,13S,14S,17S,E)-3-(hydroxyimino)-10,13-dimethyl-2,3,6,7,8,9,10,11,12,13,14,15,16,17-tetradecahydro-1H-cyclopenta[a]phenanthren-17-yl)ethan-1-one
- CAS Number: 51652-28-9
- UNII: 5DV3H4GAE5

Chemical and physical data
- Formula: C_{21}H_{30}NO_{2}
- Molar mass: 328.476 g·mol^{−1}
- 3D model (JSmol): Interactive image
- SMILES: O=C(C)[C@H]1CC[C@]2([H])[C@]1(C)CC[C@@]3([H])[C@@]2([H])CCC4=C/C(CC[C@]34C)=N/O
- InChI: InChI=1S/C21H31NO2/c1-13(23)17-6-7-18-16-5-4-14-12-15(22-24)8-10-20(14,2)19(16)9-11-21(17,18)3/h12,16-19,24H,4-11H2,1-3H3/b22-15+/t16-,17+,18-,19-,20-,21+/m0/s1; Key:FPSIMALNSFTZTF-MJRGJNICSA-N

Progesterone 3-oxime (P4-3-O), also known as 3-(hydroxyimino)pregn-4-en-3-one, is a progesterone derivative which was never marketed. It is a progestogen oxime – specifically, the C3 oxime of the progestogen progesterone. Progesterone C3 and C20 oxime conjugates, like progesterone 3-(O-carboxymethyl)oxime, have been found to be water-soluble prodrugs of progesterone and pregnane neurosteroids.

== See also ==
- List of progestogen esters § Oximes of progesterone derivatives
