= Lynestrenol phenylpropionate =

Chemical compound

Clinical data
- Other names: LPP; 17α-Ethynylestr-4-en-17β-ol 17β-(3-phenylpropionate); 19-Nor-17α-pregn-4-en-20-yn-17-ol benzenepropanoate
- Routes of administration: Intramuscular injection
- Drug class: Progestogen; Progestin; Progestogen ester

Identifiers
- IUPAC name: [(8R,9S,10R,13S,14S,17R)-17-Ethynyl-13-methyl-2,3,6,7,8,9,10,11,12,13,14,15,16,17-tetradecahydro-1H-cyclopenta[a]phenanthren-17-yl] 3-phenylpropanoate
- CAS Number: 26490-34-6
- UNII: 4Z7XB8Z997

Chemical and physical data
- Formula: C_{29}H_{36}O_{2}
- Molar mass: 416.605 g·mol^{−1}
- 3D model (JSmol): Interactive image
- SMILES: O(C(CCC1C=CC=CC=1)=O)[C@](C#C)1CC[C@]([H])2[C@@]([H])3CCC4=CCCC[C@]4([H])[C@@]3([H])CC[C@@]21C
- InChI: InChI=1S/C29H36O2/c1-3-29(31-27(30)16-13-21-9-5-4-6-10-21)20-18-26-25-15-14-22-11-7-8-12-23(22)24(25)17-19-28(26,29)2/h1,4-6,9-11,23-26H,7-8,12-20H2,2H3/t23-,24+,25+,26-,28-,29-/m0/s1; Key:JOWUABYPVVAHHK-IISZJVLJSA-N

Lynestrenol phenylpropionate (LPP), also known as ethynylestrenol phenylpropionate, is a progestin and a progestogen ester which was developed for potential use as a progestogen-only injectable contraceptive by Organon but was never marketed. It was assessed at doses of 25 to 75 mg in an oil solution once a month by intramuscular injection. LPP was associated with high contraceptive failure at the low dose and with poor cycle control. The medication was found to produce estrogenic effects in the endometrium in women due to transformation into estrogenic metabolites.

A single intramuscular injection of 50 to 100 mg LPP in oil solution has been found to have a duration of action of 14 to 30 days in terms of clinical biological effect in the uterus and on body temperature in women.

LPP has a long biological half-life in rats when given as an intramuscular depot injection; its half-life was similar to that of nandrolone laurate (nandrolone dodecanoate) and was about 2-fold longer than that of nandrolone decanoate, 10-fold longer than that of lynestrenol and nandrolone phenylpropionate, 50-fold longer than that of progesterone, and 430-fold longer than that of nandrolone.

Parenteral potencies and durations of progestogens (Note: Sources:) (Note: All given by intramuscular or subcutaneous injection.)
| Compound | Form | Dose for specific uses (mg) (Note: Progesterone production during the luteal phase is ~25 (15–50) mg/day. The OID of OHPC is 250 to 500 mg/month.) | | | DOA (Note: Duration of action in days.) |
| Compound | Form | TFD (Note: Usually given for 14 days.) | POICD (Note: Usually dosed every two to three months.) | CICD (Note: Usually dosed once monthly.) | DOA |
|---|---|---|---|---|---|
| Algestone acetophenide | Oil soln. | – | – | 75–150 | 14–32 d |
| Gestonorone caproate | Oil soln. | 25–50 | – | – | 8–13 d |
| Hydroxyprogest. acetate (Note: Never marketed or approved by this route.) | Aq. susp. | 350 | – | – | 9–16 d |
| Hydroxyprogest. caproate | Oil soln. | 250–500 (Note: In divided doses (2 × 125 or 250 mg for OHPC, 10 × 20 mg for P4).) | – | 250–500 | 5–21 d |
| Medroxyprog. acetate | Aq. susp. | 50–100 | 150 | 25 | 14–50+ d |
| Megestrol acetate | Aq. susp. | – | – | 25 | >14 d |
| Norethisterone enanthate | Oil soln. | 100–200 | 200 | 50 | 11–52 d |
| Progesterone | Oil soln. | 200 | – | – | 2–6 d |
| Progesterone | Aq. soln. | ? | – | – | 1–2 d |
| Progesterone | Aq. susp. | 50–200 | – | – | 7–14 d |
Notes and sources:

== See also ==
- List of progestogen esters § Esters of 19-nortestosterone derivatives
