= Clogestone acetate =

Chemical compound

Clinical data
- Other names: Chlormadinol acetate; AY-11440; 3β,17α-Diacetoxy-6-chloropregna-4,6-diene-20-one
- Drug class: Progestogen; Progestogen ester

Identifiers
- IUPAC name: (1S,2R,5S,10R,11S,14R,15S)-14-acetyl-5-(acetyloxy)-8-chloro-2,15-dimethyltetracyclo[8.7.0.0^{2,7}.0^{11,15}]heptadeca-6,8-dien-14-yl acetate
- CAS Number: 3044-32-4
- PubChem CID: 20055455
- ChemSpider: 16736894
- UNII: 6RU186S3NO
- KEGG: D03549
- ChEMBL: ChEMBL2106484
- CompTox Dashboard (EPA): DTXSID70184523

Chemical and physical data
- Formula: C_{25}H_{33}ClO_{5}
- Molar mass: 448.98 g·mol^{−1}
- 3D model (JSmol): Interactive image
- SMILES: CC(=O)C1(CCC2C1(CCC3C2C=C(C4=CC(CCC34C)OC(=O)C)Cl)C)OC(=O)C
- InChI: InChI=1S/C25H33ClO5/c1-14(27)25(31-16(3)29)11-8-20-18-13-22(26)21-12-17(30-15(2)28)6-9-23(21,4)19(18)7-10-24(20,25)5/h12-13,17-20H,6-11H2,1-5H3/t17-,18+,19-,20-,23+,24-,25-/m0/s1; Key:KSCZWFXQKITHSL-OKCNGXCSSA-N

Clogestone acetate (USAN; developmental code AY-11440; also known as chlormadinol acetate or 3β,17α-diacetoxy-6-chloropregna-4,6-diene-20-one) is a steroidal progestin which was investigated as a progestin-only contraceptive and postcoital contraceptive but was never marketed. It is the diacetate ester of clogestone, which, similarly was never marketed. Clogestone acetate produces chlormadinone acetate as an active metabolite.

== See also ==
- List of progestogens
- List of progestogen esters
