= Cismadinone acetate =

Chemical compound

Clinical data
- Other names: 6α-chloro-δ^{1}-dehydro-17α-acetoxyprogesterone; 6α-Chloro-1,2-didehydro-17α-acetoxyprogesterone; 6α-Chloro-17α-acetoxypregna-1,4-diene-3,20-dione
- Drug class: Progestogen; Progestogen ester

Identifiers
- IUPAC name: (1S,2R,8S,10R,11S,14R,15S)-14-acetyl-8-chloro-2,15-dimethyl-5-oxotetracyclo[8.7.0.0^{2,7}.0^{11,15}]heptadeca-3,6-dien-14-yl acetate
- CAS Number: 151-69-9
- PubChem CID: 200121
- ChemSpider: 173215
- UNII: 8IVS3A4Y7Z
- CompTox Dashboard (EPA): DTXSID50934144

Chemical and physical data
- Formula: C_{23}H_{29}ClO_{4}
- Molar mass: 404.93 g·mol^{−1}
- 3D model (JSmol): Interactive image
- SMILES: CC(=O)C1(CCC2C1(CCC3C2CC(C4=CC(=O)C=CC34C)Cl)C)OC(=O)C
- InChI: InChI=1S/C23H29ClO4/c1-13(25)23(28-14(2)26)10-7-18-16-12-20(24)19-11-15(27)5-8-21(19,3)17(16)6-9-22(18,23)4/h5,8,11,16-18,20H,6-7,9-10,12H2,1-4H3/t16-,17+,18+,20+,21-,22+,23+/m1/s1; Key:AQDNTKZTMCWYDA-WXLIAARGSA-N

Cismadinone acetate, also known as 6α-chloro-δ^{1}-dehydro-17α-acetoxyprogesterone or as 6α-chloro-17α-acetoxypregna-1,4-diene-3,20-dione, is a steroidal progestin related to the 17α-hydroxyprogesterone derivatives which was never marketed. It is the acetylated form of cismadinone, which is also a progestin but, similarly to cismadinone acetate, was never marketed.

== See also ==
- List of progestogens
- List of progestogen esters
