= Methenmadinone acetate =

Progestin

Clinical data
- Trade names: Superlutin, Antigest
- Other names: Superlutin; Superlutine; MMA; Methylenedehydroacetoxyprogesterone; MDAP; 17α-Hydroxy-16-methylene-δ^{6}-progesterone 17α-acetate; 17α-Acetoxy-16-methylenepregna-4,6-diene-3,20-dione
- Routes of administration: By mouth
- Drug class: Progestogen; Progestin; Progestogen ester

Identifiers
- IUPAC name: [(8R,9S,10R,13S,14S,17R)-17-Acetyl-10,13-dimethyl-16-methylidene-3-oxo-1,2,8,9,11,12,14,15-octahydrocyclopenta[a]phenanthren-17-yl] acetate
- CAS Number: 805-84-5
- PubChem CID: 188952
- ChemSpider: 164183
- UNII: KUR23M82TZ
- CompTox Dashboard (EPA): DTXSID701001282

Chemical and physical data
- Formula: C_{24}H_{30}O_{4}
- Molar mass: 382.500 g·mol^{−1}
- 3D model (JSmol): Interactive image
- SMILES: CC(=O)[C@]1(C(=C)C[C@@H]2[C@@]1(CC[C@H]3[C@H]2C=CC4=CC(=O)CC[C@]34C)C)OC(=O)C
- InChI: InChI=1S/C24H30O4/c1-14-12-21-19-7-6-17-13-18(27)8-10-22(17,4)20(19)9-11-23(21,5)24(14,15(2)25)28-16(3)26/h6-7,13,19-21H,1,8-12H2,2-5H3/t19-,20+,21+,22+,23+,24+/m1/s1; Key:UXRDAJMOOGEIAQ-CKOZHMEPSA-N

Methenmadinone acetate (MMA), also known as methylenedehydroacetoxyprogesterone (MDAP) and sold under the brand names Superlutin and Antigest, is a progestin medication which was developed in Czechoslovakia in the 1960s. It is the C17α acetate ester of methenmadinone.

MMA given orally shows about 13-fold the progestogenic activity of parenteral progesterone in animal bioassays.

Analogues of methenmadinone acetate include methenmadinone caproate (MMC), which was studied in combination with estradiol valerate as a combined injectable contraceptive (tentative brand name Lutofollin); chlormethenmadinone acetate (chlorsuperlutin; SCH-12600; 6-chloro-MMA), which has been used in combination with mestranol in birth control pills (brand names Biogest, Sterolibrin, Antigest B) and in veterinary medicine (brand name Agelin); bromethenmadinone acetate (bromsuperlutin; 6-bromo-MMA), which was assessed but was never marketed; and melengestrol acetate (methylsuperlutin; 6-methyl-MMA), which is used in veterinary medicine.

== See also ==
- List of progestogen esters § Esters of 17α-hydroxyprogesterone derivatives
- 16-Methylene-17α-hydroxyprogesterone acetate
