= C25H32O3 =

The molecular formula C_{25}H_{32}O_{3} (molar mass: 380.520 g/mol, exact mass: 380.2351 u) may refer to:

- Levonorgestrel cyclopropylcarboxylate
- Nilestriol
