= 6,6-Difluoronorethisterone =

Chemical compound

Clinical data
- Other names: 6,6-Difluoro-17α-ethynyl-19-nortestosterone; 6,6-Difluoro-17α-ethynylestr-4-en-17β-ol-3-one

Identifiers
- IUPAC name: (1S,2R,10R,11S,14S,15S)-14-Ethynyl-8,8-difluoro-14-hydroxy-15-methyltetracyclo[8.7.0.0^{2,7}.0^{11,15}]heptadec-6-en-5-one
- CAS Number: 25450-33-3
- PubChem CID: 54556868
- ChemSpider: 103884208
- UNII: HUA24YN5XE

Chemical and physical data
- Formula: C_{20}H_{24}F_{2}O_{2}
- Molar mass: 334.407 g·mol^{−1}
- 3D model (JSmol): Interactive image
- SMILES: C[C@]12CC[C@H]3[C@@H](CC(F)(F)C4=CC(=O)CC[C@H]34)[C@@H]1CC[C@]2(O)C#C
- InChI: InChI=1S/C20H24F2O2/c1-3-19(24)9-7-16-15-11-20(21,22)17-10-12(23)4-5-14(17)13(15)6-8-18(16,19)2/h1,10,13-16,24H,4-9,11H2,2H3/t13-,14-,15-,16+,18?,19-/m1/s1; Key:ZNTYQLFNPTXSPS-ZBWOJIPPSA-N

6,6-Difluoronorethisterone, also known as 6,6-difluoro-17α-ethynyl-19-nortestosterone or as 6,6-difluoro-17α-ethynylestr-4-en-17β-ol-3-one, is a steroidal progestin of the 19-nortestosterone group that was described in 1971 but was never marketed. It is a fluorinated derivative of norethisterone. The C17β acetate ester, 6,6-difluoronorethisterone acetate, has also been synthesized and described.
