= Amadinone =

Chemical compound

Clinical data
- Other names: 6-Chloro-17α-hydroxy-19-norpregna-4,6-dione

Identifiers
- IUPAC name: (1S,2R,10R,11S,14R,15S)-14-acetyl-8-chloro-14-hydroxy-15-methyltetracyclo[8.7.0.0^{2,7}.0^{11,15}]heptadeca-6,8-dien-5-one
- CAS Number: 30781-27-2
- PubChem CID: 10315768
- ChemSpider: 8491233
- UNII: 6MB06022N0
- CompTox Dashboard (EPA): DTXSID40865559

Chemical and physical data
- Formula: C_{20}H_{25}ClO_{3}
- Molar mass: 348.87 g·mol^{−1}
- 3D model (JSmol): Interactive image
- SMILES: CC(=O)[C@]1(CC[C@@H]2[C@@]1(CC[C@H]3[C@H]2C=C(C4=CC(=O)CC[C@H]34)Cl)C)O
- InChI: InChI=1S/C20H25ClO3/c1-11(22)20(24)8-6-17-15-10-18(21)16-9-12(23)3-4-13(16)14(15)5-7-19(17,20)2/h9-10,13-15,17,24H,3-8H2,1-2H3/t13-,14-,15-,17+,19+,20+/m1/s1; Key:ANJGIFXUFSBZPX-WLCXVKOPSA-N

Amadinone (INN), also known as 19-norchlormadinone, is a steroidal progestin of the 19-norprogesterone and 17α-hydroxyprogesterone groups that was synthesized and characterized in 1968 but was never marketed. It has antigonadotropic properties, and for this reason, is a functional antiandrogen. An acetate ester, amadinone acetate, also exists, but similarly was never marketed.

== See also ==
- Chlormadinone
- Chlormadinone acetate
