= Melengestrol acetate =

Chemical compound

Clinical data
- Trade names: Heifermax, MGA
- Other names: MGA; MLA; MLGA; Melengesterol acetate; Methylsuperlutin; U-21240; BDH-1921; 17α-Acetoxy-16-methylene-6-methyl-6-dehydroprogesterone; 17α-Acetoxy-16-methylene-6-methylpregna-4,6-diene-3,20-dione
- Drug class: Progestogen; Progestin; Progestogen ester
- ATC code: None

Identifiers
- IUPAC name: [(8R,9S,10R,13S,14S,17R)-17-acetyl-6,10,13-trimethyl-16-methylidene-3-oxo-1,2,8,9,11,12,14,15-octahydrocyclopenta[a]phenanthren-17-yl] acetate
- CAS Number: 2919-66-6
- PubChem CID: 250948
- DrugBank: DB14659
- ChemSpider: 219803
- UNII: 4W5HDS3936
- KEGG: D04900
- CompTox Dashboard (EPA): DTXSID5048184
- ECHA InfoCard: 100.018.964

Chemical and physical data
- Formula: C_{25}H_{32}O_{4}
- Molar mass: 396.527 g·mol^{−1}
- 3D model (JSmol): Interactive image
- SMILES: O=C4\C=C3\C(=C/[C@@H]1[C@H](CC[C@@]2([C@](OC(=O)C)(C(=C)\C[C@@H]12)C(=O)C)C)[C@@]3(C)CC4)C
- InChI: InChI=1S/C25H32O4/c1-14-11-19-20(23(5)9-7-18(28)13-21(14)23)8-10-24(6)22(19)12-15(2)25(24,16(3)26)29-17(4)27/h11,13,19-20,22H,2,7-10,12H2,1,3-6H3/t19-,20+,22+,23-,24+,25+/m1/s1; Key:UDKABVSQKJNZBH-DWNQPYOZSA-N

Melengestrol acetate (MLGA), sold under the brand names Heifermax and MGA among others, is a progestin medication which is used in animal reproduction. It is not approved for use in humans, and is instead used as an implantable contraceptive for captive animals in zoos and other refuges, and is also used as a feed additive to promote growth in cattle, a purpose it is licensed for in the United States and Canada.

== Uses ==
=== Animal reproduction ===
MLGA is used in animal reproduction.

== Pharmacology ==
=== Pharmacodynamics ===
MLGA is a progestogen, and hence is an agonist of the progesterone receptor. It has been found to possess 73% of the affinity of progesterone for the progesterone receptor in rhesus monkey uterus.

== Chemistry ==
MLGA, also known as 17α-acetoxy-16-methylene-6-dehydro-6-methylprogesterone or as 17α-acetoxy-16-methylene-6-methylpregna-4,6-diene-3,20-dione, is a synthetic pregnane steroid and a derivative of progesterone. It is specifically a derivative of 17α-hydroxyprogesterone with a methyl group at the C6 position, a methylene group at the C16 position, a double bond between the C6 and C7 positions, and an acetate ester at the C17α position. As such, it is also a derivative of 16-methylene-17α-hydroxyprogesterone acetate. MLGA is the acetate ester of melengestrol, which in contrast, has never been marketed. Analogues of MLGA include other 17α-hydroxyprogesterone derivatives such as chlormadinone acetate, chlormethenmadinone acetate, cyproterone acetate, delmadinone acetate, hydroxyprogesterone caproate, medroxyprogesterone acetate, megestrol acetate, methenmadinone acetate, and osaterone acetate. The only structural difference between MLGA and megestrol acetate is the presence of the C16 methylene group in the former.

== Society and culture ==
=== Legal status ===
In November 2024, the FDA approved melengestrol acetate Type A liquid medicated article (brand name MEL 500) for increased rate of weight gain, improved feed efficiency and suppression of estrus (heat) in heifers fed in confinement for slaughter; and for suppression of estrus (heat) in heifers intended for breeding.

=== Generic names ===
Melengestrol acetate is the generic name of the drug and its USAN and USP. Melengestrol is the INN and BAN of the unesterified free alcohol form.

=== Brand names ===
MLGA is marketed under the brand names Heifermax and MGA among others.
