= Hydromadinone =

Chemical compound

Clinical data
- ATC code: None

Identifiers
- IUPAC name: 6α-Chloro-17α-hydroxypregn-4-ene-3,20-dione
- CAS Number: 16469-74-2
- PubChem CID: 216252
- ChemSpider: 187450
- UNII: 3E4M0PPR7J
- ChEMBL: ChEMBL2104256
- CompTox Dashboard (EPA): DTXSID101032104

Chemical and physical data
- Formula: C_{21}H_{29}ClO_{3}
- Molar mass: 364.91 g·mol^{−1}
- 3D model (JSmol): Interactive image
- SMILES: CC(=O)[C@]1(CC[C@@H]2[C@@]1(CC[C@H]3[C@H]2C[C@@H](C4=CC(=O)CC[C@]34C)Cl)C)O
- InChI: InChI=1S/C21H29ClO3/c1-12(23)21(25)9-6-16-14-11-18(22)17-10-13(24)4-7-19(17,2)15(14)5-8-20(16,21)3/h10,14-16,18,25H,4-9,11H2,1-3H3/t14-,15+,16+,18+,19-,20+,21+/m1/s1; Key:IMUIZZGKYILUHZ-SCUQKFFVSA-N

Hydromadinone (INN), also known as 6α-chloro-17α-hydroxyprogesterone, is a steroidal progestin of the 17α-hydroxyprogesterone group which was patented in 1967 but was never marketed. The C17α acetate ester of hydromadinone, hydromadinone acetate, also exists, but similarly was never marketed.

== See also ==
- 17α-Hydroxyprogesterone
- Chlormadinone
- Cyproterone
- Delmadinone
- Haloprogesterone
