= Clomegestone acetate =

Chemical compound

Clinical data
- Other names: Clomagestone acetate; SH-741; 6-Chloro-17α-acetoxy-16α-methylpregna-4,6-diene-3,20-dione
- Drug class: Progestogen; Progestogen ester

Identifiers
- IUPAC name: (1S,2R,10R,11S,13R,14R,15S)-14-acetyl-8-chloro-2,13,15-trimethyl-5-oxotetracyclo[8.7.0.0^{2,7}.0^{11,15}]heptadeca-6,8-dien-14-yl acetate
- CAS Number: 424-89-5
- PubChem CID: 20055456
- ChemSpider: 16736896
- UNII: 8OIJ6341W7
- KEGG: D03550
- ChEMBL: ChEMBL2104126
- CompTox Dashboard (EPA): DTXSID40962456

Chemical and physical data
- Formula: C_{24}H_{31}ClO_{4}
- Molar mass: 418.96 g·mol^{−1}
- 3D model (JSmol): Interactive image
- SMILES: CC1CC2C3C=C(C4=CC(=O)CCC4(C3CCC2(C1(C(=O)C)OC(=O)C)C)C)Cl
- InChI: InChI=1S/C24H31ClO4/c1-13-10-19-17-12-21(25)20-11-16(28)6-8-22(20,4)18(17)7-9-23(19,5)24(13,14(2)26)29-15(3)27/h11-13,17-19H,6-10H2,1-5H3/t13-,17-,18+,19+,22-,23+,24+/m1/s1; Key:WWSKHPDYSWDMNC-YRNSVOBJSA-N

Clomegestone acetate (USAN; developmental code SH-741; also known as clomagestone acetate or 6-chloro-17α-acetoxy-16α-methylpregna-4,6-diene-3,20-dione) is a steroidal progestin of the 17α-hydroxyprogesterone group which was developed as an oral contraceptive but was never marketed. It is the acetate ester of clomegestone, which, similarly to clomegestone acetate, was never marketed. Clomegestone acetate is also the 17-desoxy cogener of clometherone, and is somewhat more potent in comparison. Similarly to cyproterone acetate, clomegestone acetate has been found to alter insulin receptor concentrations in adipose tissue, and this may indicate the presence of glucocorticoid activity.
