= Melengestrol =

Chemical compound

Clinical data
- ATC code: None

Identifiers
- IUPAC name: 17α-hydroxy-6-methyl-16-methylenepregna-4,6-diene-3,20-dione
- CAS Number: 5633-18-1
- PubChem CID: 9906614
- ChemSpider: 8082266
- UNII: BX98J4T6JU
- CompTox Dashboard (EPA): DTXSID00204869
- ECHA InfoCard: 100.024.613

Chemical and physical data
- Formula: C_{23}H_{30}O_{3}
- Molar mass: 354.490 g·mol^{−1}
- 3D model (JSmol): Interactive image
- SMILES: O=C4\C=C3\C(=C/[C@@H]1[C@H](CC[C@@]2([C@](O)(C(=C)\C[C@@H]12)C(=O)C)C)[C@@]3(C)CC4)C
- InChI: InChI=1S/C23H30O3/c1-13-10-17-18(21(4)8-6-16(25)12-19(13)21)7-9-22(5)20(17)11-14(2)23(22,26)15(3)24/h10,12,17-18,20,26H,2,6-9,11H2,1,3-5H3/t17-,18+,20+,21-,22+,23+/m1/s1; Key:OKHAOBQKCCIRLO-IBVJIVQJSA-N

Melengestrol (INN, BAN) is a steroidal progestin of the 17α-hydroxyprogesterone group and an antineoplastic drug which was never marketed. An acylated derivative, melengestrol acetate, is used as a growth promoter in animals.

While melengestrol is sometimes used as a synonym for melengestrol acetate, what is usually being referred to is melengestrol acetate and not melengestrol.

== Synthesis ==
6-Methyl-16-dehydropregnenolone acetate (5) is the key intermediate to the preparation of both melengesterol acetate and medrogestone. Petrov and his collaborators have devised several interesting schemes that go back to diosgenin as the starting point. These schemes perform the necessary modifications in rings A and B with the sapogenin side chain still in place. In essence this approach employs this side chain as a protecting group for the future 16-dehydro-20-ketone function. In one of these routes, diosgenin is first converted to the 3-toluenesulfonate (1). Solvolysis of this homoallylic alcohol derivative affords the 3,5-cyclosteroid (2), via the cyclopropyl carbinyl ion (carbenium ion) (not shown). (This general reaction was probably first found in the steroids and bore the name of "i-steroid rearrangement.") Oxidation of the product by means of PCC affords the ketone. Reaction of this with methylmagnesium iodide affords two isomeric carbinols with the α-isomer predominating (3). Solvolysis in the presence of a nucleophile such as acetic acid reverses the cyclopropylcarbinyl transformation to afford homoallylic acetate. Removal of the sapogenin side chain leads to the desired product (5).

Melengesterol synthesis:

Substitution at the 16 position was found to lead to further potentiation of progestational activity. Reaction with diazomethane at the conjugated double bond at 16 gives first the pyrazole (6). This heterocycle affords the 16 methyl enone on pyrolysis (7). Selective epoxidation of the conjugated double bond to the 16,17α-epoxide over that at 5,6 is achieved by oxidation with basic hydrogen peroxide (8). Opening of this tetrasubstituted oxirane ring in acid proceeds with loss of a proton from the β position (16 methyl) (9) to afford the desired 16-methylene-17α-hydroxy-20-ketone functionality in the D ring (10). The product is saponified and then the subject of an Oppenauer oxidation, which is then dehydrogenated to the 4,6-diene with chloranil (11). Acetylation under forcing conditions completes the synthesis of melengesterol acetate.

== See also ==
- Melengestrol acetate
