= Progestogen-only injectable contraceptive =

Long-acting reversible contraceptives (LARC)

Background
- Type: Hormonal
- First use: 1957

Pregnancy rates (first year)
- Perfect use: 0.2%
- Typical use: 6%

Usage
- Reversibility: Yes
- User reminders: ?

Advantages and disadvantages
- STI protection: No

Progestogen-only injectable contraceptives (POICs) are a form of hormonal contraception and progestogen-only contraception that are administered by injection and providing long-lasting birth control. As opposed to combined injectable contraceptives, they contain only a progestogen without an estrogen, and include two progestin preparations:

- Medroxyprogesterone acetate (brand names Depo-Provera, Provera, Depo-subQ Provera 104) – 150 mg (intramuscularly) or 104 mg (subcutaneously) every 3 months
- Norethisterone enanthate (brand names NET EN, Noristerat, Norigest, Doryxas) – 200 mg (intramuscularly) every 2 months

== Mechanism of action ==
These POICs work by providing an influx of progesterone into the female body. This influx will signal to the body that it does not need to synthesize its own hormones to induce the cycle. Since the body does not release any hormones of its own, there are no fluctuations in levels to trigger the phases in menstruation and ovulation does not occur.

== Potential side effects ==
As will all birth control medications, certain side effects may occur from taking the hormonal supplements. Changes in menstrual bleeding may occur, such as a lighter flow or complete stop to the regular monthly menses, or abnormal bleeding throughout the cycle. Others have reported small weight gain, and increase in headaches or mood swings, and a decrease in libido.

== Links to cancer ==
Some research has shown that women who have taken hormonal birth controls could possible be less likely to develop certain cancers, such as endometrial, cervical, and ovarian. This is likely due to the fact that the hormonal birth controls stop the monthly cycle of injury and repair to the endometrial tissue. This consistent injury to the uterine tissues is thought to be a factor in developing certain cancers, so if it is stopped for a period of time, the tissue will be less damaged than that of someone who has never taken birth control.

On the contrary, it was shown that women who has previously or were currently taking a hormonal birth control had an increased risk in developing breast cancer. This risk decreased as the individuals stopped the birth control, but no data was found linked to the duration of time one was taking a contraceptive.

== Research ==
Progestogens that have been studied for potential use as POICs but were never marketed as such include the progesterone derivatives algestone acetophenide (dihydroxyprogesterone acetophenide) (100 mg/month), chlormadinone acetate (250 mg/3 months), hydroxyprogesterone caproate (250–500 mg/month), gestonorone caproate (2.5–200 mg/1–2 months), and oxogestone phenpropionate (50–75 mg/month), and the testosterone derivatives lynestrenol phenylpropionate (25–75 mg/month), levonorgestrel butanoate, levonorgestrel cyclobutylcarboxylate, and levonorgestrel cyclopropylcarboxylate. Some of these have been introduced for use in combined injectable contraceptives instead.

== See also ==
- Combined oral contraceptive pill
- Progestogen-only pill
