= Methenmadinone =

Chemical compound

Clinical data
- Other names: Deacetylsuperlutin; 16-Methylene-6-dehydro-17α-hydroxyprogesterone; 16-Methylenepregna-4,6-diene-3,20-dione; 16-Methyl-4,6,16-pregnatriene-3,20-dione
- Drug class: Progestogen; Progestin

Identifiers
- IUPAC name: (8S,9S,10R,13S,14S,17S)-17-Acetyl-10,13-dimethyl-16-methylidene-2,8,9,11,12,14,15,17-octahydro-1H-cyclopenta[a]phenanthren-3-one
- CAS Number: 6723-96-2
- PubChem CID: 22809370

Chemical and physical data
- Formula: C_{22}H_{28}O_{2}
- Molar mass: 324.464 g·mol^{−1}
- 3D model (JSmol): Interactive image
- SMILES: CC(=O)[C@H]1C(=C)C[C@@H]2[C@@]1(CC[C@H]3[C@H]2C=CC4=CC(=O)CC[C@]34C)C
- InChI: InChI=1S/C22H28O2/c1-13-11-19-17-6-5-15-12-16(24)7-9-21(15,3)18(17)8-10-22(19,4)20(13)14(2)23/h5-6,12,17-20H,1,7-11H2,2-4H3/t17-,18+,19+,20-,21+,22+/m1/s1; Key:SLRUDSFURBMIQT-HQZKGGBDSA-N

Methenmadinone, also known as deacetylsuperlutin or as 16-methylene-6-dehydro-17α-hydroxyprogesterone, is a pregnane steroid which was never marketed. It is a parent compound of methenmadinone acetate (the C17α acetate ester), melengestrol (the C6 methyl derivative), and chlormethenmadinone (the C6 chloro derivative).
