= Clomegestone =

Chemical compound

Identifiers
- IUPAC name: (1S,2R,10R,11S,13R,14R,15S)-14-Acetyl-8-chloro-14-hydroxy-2,13,15-trimethyltetracyclo[8.7.0.0^{2,7}.0^{11,15}]heptadeca-6,8-dien-5-one
- CAS Number: 5367-84-0
- PubChem CID: 56840824
- ChemSpider: 32701810
- UNII: ZHW74QJU5V
- CompTox Dashboard (EPA): DTXSID201023859

Chemical and physical data
- Formula: C_{22}H_{29}ClO_{3}
- Molar mass: 376.92 g·mol^{−1}
- 3D model (JSmol): Interactive image
- SMILES: CC1CC2C3C=C(C4=CC(=O)CCC4(C3CCC2(C1(C(=O)C)O)C)C)Cl
- InChI: InChI=1S/C22H29ClO3/c1-12-9-17-15-11-19(23)18-10-14(25)5-7-20(18,3)16(15)6-8-21(17,4)22(12,26)13(2)24/h10-12,15-17,26H,5-9H2,1-4H3/t12-,15-,16+,17+,20-,21+,22+/m1/s1; Key:GQBSINXSPAZDSK-ROXMKHFISA-N

Clomegestone (INN; also known as clomagestone or 6-chloro-17α-hydroxy-16α-methylpregna-4,6-diene-3,20-dione) is a steroidal progestin of the 17α-hydroxyprogesterone group that was never marketed. An acetate ester, clomegestone acetate, also exists, and similarly was never marketed.
