= Pentagestrone =

Chemical compound

Clinical data
- Other names: 17α-Hydroxyprogesterone 3-cyclopentyl enol ether
- Drug class: Progestogen ether

Identifiers
- IUPAC name: 1-[(8R,9S,10R,13S,14S,17R)-3-cyclopentyloxy-17-hydroxy-10,13-dimethyl-1,2,7,8,9,11,12,14,15,16-decahydrocyclopenta[a]phenanthren-17-yl]ethanone
- CAS Number: 7001-56-1
- PubChem CID: 3047827
- ChemSpider: 2310139
- UNII: L34YL185WL
- ChEMBL: ChEMBL2104801

Chemical and physical data
- Formula: C_{26}H_{38}O_{3}
- Molar mass: 398.587 g·mol^{−1}
- 3D model (JSmol): Interactive image
- SMILES: CC(=O)C1(CCC2C1(CCC3C2CC=C4C3(CCC(=C4)OC5CCCC5)C)C)O
- InChI: InChI=1S/C26H38O3/c1-17(27)26(28)15-12-23-21-9-8-18-16-20(29-19-6-4-5-7-19)10-13-24(18,2)22(21)11-14-25(23,26)3/h8,16,19,21-23,28H,4-7,9-15H2,1-3H3/t21-,22+,23+,24+,25+,26+/m1/s1; Key:RBFQPFFCDLXWQK-UXUCURBISA-N

Pentagestrone (INN), also known as 17α-hydroxyprogesterone 3-cyclopentyl enol ether, is a steroidal progestin of the 17α-hydroxyprogesterone group that was never marketed. An acetate ester, pentagestrone acetate (Gestovis, Gestovister), has been marketed for clinical use. Pentagestrone was described in the literature in 1960.

== See also ==
- Quingestrone
