= Metynodiol =

Chemical compound

Clinical data
- Other names: 11β-Methyl-19-norpregn-4-en-20-yne-3β,17α-diol; (3β,11β,17β)-17-ethynyl-11-methylestr-4-ene-3,17-diol

Identifiers
- IUPAC name: (1S,2R,5S,10R,11S,14R,15S,17S)-14-ethynyl-15,17-dimethyltetracyclo[8.7.0.0^{2,7}.0^{11,15}]heptadec-6-ene-5,14-diol
- CAS Number: 23163-42-0
- PubChem CID: 10018547
- ChemSpider: 8194120
- UNII: RY422150VY
- CompTox Dashboard (EPA): DTXSID60177742

Chemical and physical data
- Formula: C_{21}H_{30}O_{2}
- Molar mass: 314.469 g·mol^{−1}
- 3D model (JSmol): Interactive image
- SMILES: CC1CC2(C(CCC2(C#C)O)C3C1C4CCC(C=C4CC3)O)C
- InChI: InChI=1S/C21H30O2/c1-4-21(23)10-9-18-17-7-5-14-11-15(22)6-8-16(14)19(17)13(2)12-20(18,21)3/h1,11,13,15-19,22-23H,5-10,12H2,2-3H3/t13-,15-,16-,17-,18-,19+,20-,21-/m0/s1; Key:DLTWUXUDIFVVOM-OSFPVTNASA-N

Metynodiol (INN), or methynodiol, also known as 11β-methyletynodiol, is a steroidal progestin of the 19-nortestosterone group that was synthesized in the 1960s but was never marketed. A diacetate ester, metynodiol diacetate (SC-19198), also exists.

== See also ==
- Etynodiol
- Etynodiol diacetate
