= Metynodiol diacetate =

Steroidal progestin

Clinical data
- Other names: Metynodiol diacetate; SC-19198; 11β-Methyletynodiol diacetate; 11β-Methyl-19-norpregn-4-en-20-yne-3β,17α-diyl diacetate; 11β-Methyl-17α-ethynylestr-4-ene-3β,17β-diol diacetate
- Drug class: Progestogen; Progestogen ester

Identifiers
- IUPAC name: (1S,2R,5S,10R,11S,14R,15S,17S)-5-(acetyloxy)-14-ethynyl-15,17-dimethyltetracyclo[8.7.0.0^{2,7}.0^{11,15}]heptadec-6-en-14-yl acetate
- CAS Number: 23163-51-1
- PubChem CID: 10408585
- ChemSpider: 8584022
- UNII: 2BC0LM6I2M
- KEGG: D05003
- ChEMBL: ChEMBL2106950
- CompTox Dashboard (EPA): DTXSID30945839

Chemical and physical data
- Formula: C_{25}H_{34}O_{4}
- Molar mass: 398.543 g·mol^{−1}
- 3D model (JSmol): Interactive image
- SMILES: CC1CC2(C(CCC2(C#C)OC(=O)C)C3C1C4CCC(C=C4CC3)OC(=O)C)C
- InChI: InChI=1S/C25H34O4/c1-6-25(29-17(4)27)12-11-22-21-9-7-18-13-19(28-16(3)26)8-10-20(18)23(21)15(2)14-24(22,25)5/h1,13,15,19-23H,7-12,14H2,2-5H3/t15-,19-,20-,21-,22-,23+,24-,25-/m0/s1; Key:GFIDKNMXIYHURY-YIHNMZODSA-N

Methynodiol diacetate (USAN) (developmental code name SC-19198), or metynodiol diacetate, also known as 11β-methyletynodiol diacetate, is a steroidal progestin of the 19-nortestosterone group which was patented in 1968 but was never marketed. It is the diacetate ester of metynodiol, which, similarly, was never marketed.

== See also ==
- Etynodiol
- Etynodiol diacetate
- List of progestogen esters
