= Progesterone dioxime =

Chemical compound

Clinical data
- Other names: Progesterone 3,20-dioxime; P4-3,20-DO; Pregn-4-ene-3,20-dione 3,20-dioxime; 3,20-Di(hydroxyimino)pregn-4-en-3-one

Identifiers
- IUPAC name: (NZ)-N-[1-[(3E,8S,9S,10R,13S,14S,17S)-3-hydroxyimino-10,13-dimethyl-1,2,6,7,8,9,11,12,14,15,16,17-dodecahydrocyclopenta[a]phenanthren-17-yl]ethylidene]hydroxylamine
- CAS Number: 26144-38-7
- PubChem CID: 91692079
- ChemSpider: 7875670
- UNII: PYB4REL6XV

Chemical and physical data
- Formula: C_{21}H_{32}N_{2}O_{2}
- Molar mass: 344.499 g·mol^{−1}
- 3D model (JSmol): Interactive image
- Melting point: 238–242 °C (460–468 °F) (recrystallized from alcohol)
- SMILES: C/C(=N/O)/[C@H]1CC[C@@H]2[C@@]1(CC[C@H]3[C@H]2CCC4=C/C(=N/O)/CC[C@]34C)C
- InChI: InChI=1S/C21H32N2O2/c1-13(22-24)17-6-7-18-16-5-4-14-12-15(23-25)8-10-20(14,2)19(16)9-11-21(17,18)3/h12,16-19,24-25H,4-11H2,1-3H3/b22-13-,23-15+/t16-,17+,18-,19-,20-,21+/m0/s1; Key:JKENIRSEIALBGX-GWUBATFGSA-N

Progesterone dioxime, or progesterone 3,20-dioxime (P4-3,20-DO), also known as 3,20-di(hydroxyimino)pregn-4-en-3-one, is a progesterone derivative which was never marketed. It is a progestogen oxime – specifically, the C3 and C20 dioxime of the progestogen progesterone. Progesterone C3 and C20 oxime conjugates have been found to be water-soluble prodrugs of progesterone and pregnane neurosteroids.

== See also ==
- List of progestogen esters § Oximes of progesterone derivatives
