= Cymegesolate =

Chemical compound

Clinical data
- Other names: Cypionyl megestrol acetate; Megestrol acetate 3β-cypionate; Megestrol acetate 3β-cyclopentylpropionate; Progestin No. 1; Progestin I; Progestagen I; 17α-Acetoxy-6-dehydro-6-methylprogesterone 3β-cypionate; 17α-Acetoxy-6-methylpregna-4,6-diene-3,20-dione 3β-cypionate
- Routes of administration: By mouth
- Drug class: Progestin; Progestogen; Progestogen ester

Identifiers
- IUPAC name: [(3S,8R,9S,10R,13S,14S,17R)-17-Acetyl-17-acetyloxy-6,10,13-trimethyl-1,2,3,8,9,11,12,14,15,16-decahydrocyclopenta[a]phenanthren-3-yl] 3-cyclopentylpropanoate
- CAS Number: 72648-88-5
- PubChem CID: 126290
- ChemSpider: 112247
- UNII: 4D9TFH8PLX
- CompTox Dashboard (EPA): DTXSID70993490

Chemical and physical data
- Formula: C_{32}H_{46}O_{5}
- Molar mass: 510.715 g·mol^{−1}
- 3D model (JSmol): Interactive image
- SMILES: CC1=C[C@@H]2[C@H](CC[C@]3([C@H]2CC[C@@]3(C(=O)C)OC(=O)C)C)[C@@]4(C1=C[C@H](CC4)OC(=O)CCC5CCCC5)C
- InChI: InChI=1S/C32H46O5/c1-20-18-25-26(13-16-31(5)27(25)14-17-32(31,21(2)33)37-22(3)34)30(4)15-12-24(19-28(20)30)36-29(35)11-10-23-8-6-7-9-23/h18-19,23-27H,6-17H2,1-5H3/t24-,25+,26-,27-,30+,31-,32-/m0/s1; Key:WAHQVRCNDCHDIB-QZYSPNBYSA-N

Cymegesolate (developmental code name Progestin No. 1), also known as cypionyl megestrol acetate or as megestrol acetate 3β-cypionate, is a progestin medication which was never marketed. It was developed in China in the late 1970s and early to mid 1980s for use as a hormonal contraceptive. The medication was formulated at a dose of 50–100 mg in combination with a "trace" dose of 0.25–0.5 mg quinestrol as a long-lasting, once-a-month combined oral contraceptive pill. This combination has been studied in 1,213 women across a total of 9,651 menstrual cycles, with contraceptive effectiveness of over 99.13% and "very few side effects." At the high dose (100 mg / 0.5 mg), it showed an anovulation rate of only about 60%, and instead mediated its contraceptive effects via a marked anti-implantation effect.

== Chemistry ==
Cymegesolate, also known as megestrol acetate 3β-cypionate, as well as 17α-acetoxy-6-dehydro-6-methylprogesterone 3β-cyclopentylpropionate or 17α-acetoxy-6-methylpregna-4,6-diene-3,20-dione 3β-cyclopentylpropionate, is a synthetic pregnane steroid and a derivative of progesterone and 17α-hydroxyprogesterone. It is the C3β cypionate (cyclopentylpropionate) ester of megestrol acetate. A closely related medication is acetomepregenol (mepregenol diacetate; also known as megestrol 3β,17α-diacetate), which, in contrast, has been marketed.
