= 16-Methylene-17α-hydroxyprogesterone acetate =

Chemical compound

Clinical data
- Other names: 16-Methylene-17α-acetoxyprogesterone; 16-Methylene-17α-acetoxypregn-4-en-3,20-dione
- Drug class: Progestogen; Progestin; Progestogen ester

Identifiers
- IUPAC name: [(8R,9S,10R,13S,14S,17R)-17-Acetyl-10,13-dimethyl-16-methylidene-3-oxo-1,2,6,7,8,9,11,12,14,15-decahydrocyclopenta[a]phenanthren-17-yl] acetate
- CAS Number: 6815-51-6
- PubChem CID: 151431
- ChemSpider: 133463
- UNII: XYO20AWR0I
- CompTox Dashboard (EPA): DTXSID20987647

Chemical and physical data
- Formula: C_{24}H_{32}O_{4}
- Molar mass: 384.516 g·mol^{−1}
- 3D model (JSmol): Interactive image
- SMILES: CC(=O)[C@]1(C(=C)C[C@@H]2[C@@]1(CC[C@H]3[C@H]2CCC4=CC(=O)CC[C@]34C)C)OC(=O)C
- InChI: InChI=1S/C24H32O4/c1-14-12-21-19-7-6-17-13-18(27)8-10-22(17,4)20(19)9-11-23(21,5)24(14,15(2)25)28-16(3)26/h13,19-21H,1,6-12H2,2-5H3/t19-,20+,21+,22+,23+,24+/m1/s1; Key:XSNMCQGNVPSIQM-CKOZHMEPSA-N

16-Methylene-17α-hydroxyprogesterone acetate is a progestin of the 17α-hydroxyprogesterone group which was never marketed. Given orally, it shows about 2.5-fold the progestogenic activity of parenteral progesterone in animal bioassays. It is a parent compound of the following clinically used progestins:

- Chlormethenmadinone acetate (6-chloro-16-methylene-17α-hydroxy-Δ^{6}-progesterone acetate)
- Melengestrol acetate (6-methyl-16-methylene-17α-hydroxy-Δ^{6}-progesterone acetate)
- Methenmadinone acetate (16-methylene-17α-hydroxy-Δ^{6}-progesterone acetate)
- Segesterone acetate (16-methylene-17α-hydroxy-19-norprogesterone acetate)
