= Levonorgestrel cyclopropylcarboxylate =

Chemical compound

Clinical data
- Other names: HRP-003; HRP003; Levonorgestrel cyclopropyl-carboxylate; Levonorgestrel 17β-cyclopropylcarboxylate; 17α-Ethynyl-18-methyl-19-nortestosterone 17β-cyclopropylcarboxylate; 17α-Ethynyl-18-methylestr-4-en-17β-ol-3-one 17β-cyclopropylcarboxylate; 13-Ethyl-17α-hydroxy-18,19-dinorpregn-4-en-20-yn-3-one cyclopropanecarboxylate
- Routes of administration: Intramuscular injection
- Drug class: Progestogen; Progestin; Progestogen ester

Identifiers
- IUPAC name: [(8R,9S,10R,13S,14S,17R)-13-Ethyl-17-ethynyl-3-oxo-1,2,6,7,8,9,10,11,12,14,15,16-dodecahydrocyclopenta[a]phenanthren-17-yl] cyclopropanecarboxylate
- CAS Number: 86679-35-8
- PubChem CID: 10317658
- ChemSpider: 8493122

Chemical and physical data
- Formula: C_{25}H_{32}O_{3}
- Molar mass: 380.528 g·mol^{−1}
- 3D model (JSmol): Interactive image
- SMILES: CC[C@]12CC[C@H]3[C@H]([C@@H]1CC[C@]2(C#C)OC(=O)C4CC4)CCC5=CC(=O)CC[C@H]35
- InChI: InChI=1S/C25H32O3/c1-3-24-13-11-20-19-10-8-18(26)15-17(19)7-9-21(20)22(24)12-14-25(24,4-2)28-23(27)16-5-6-16/h2,15-16,19-22H,3,5-14H2,1H3/t19-,20+,21+,22-,24-,25-/m0/s1; Key:TZZXNSUFTUXHRE-AYEDEZQKSA-N

Levonorgestrel cyclopropylcarboxylate (developmental code name HRP-003), or levonorgestrel 17β-cyclopropylcarboxylate, is a progestin and a progestogen ester which was studied for potential use as an injectable hormonal contraceptive but was never marketed. It was developed by the World Health Organization's Special Programme on Human Reproduction in the 1980s. Analogues of levonorgestrel cyclopropylcarboxylate include levonorgestrel cyclobutylcarboxylate (HRP-001) and levonorgestrel butanoate (HRP-002).

== See also ==
- List of progestogen esters § Esters of 19-nortestosterone derivatives
- Progestogen-only injectable contraceptive
