= Bolinaquinone =

Names
- Preferred IUPAC name 2-Hydroxy-5-methoxy-3-{[(1R,2R,4aS,8aS)-1,2,4a,5-tetramethyl-1,2,3,4,4a,7,8,8a-octahydronaphthalen-2-yl]methyl}cyclohexa-2,5-diene-1,4-dione
- Other names Bolinaquinone

Identifiers
CAS Number	216498-95-2
3D model (JSmol)	Interactive image
ChEMBL	ChEMBL477692
ChemSpider	8242519
PubChem CID	10066979
UNII	HQ9RW9S9S5
- InChI: InChI=1S/C22H30O4/c1-13-7-6-8-16-14(2)21(3,9-10-22(13,16)4)12-15-19(24)17(23)11-18(26-5)20(15)25/h7,11,14,16,24H,6,8-10,12H2,1-5H3/t14-,16+,21-,22-/m1/s1 Key: PYUXUMSQSVWNDS-NSAJDELNSA-N; InChI=1/C22H30O4/c1-13-7-6-8-16-14(2)21(3,9-10-22(13,16)4)12-15-19(24)17(23)11-18(26-5)20(15)25/h7,11,14,16,24H,6,8-10,12H2,1-5H3/t14-,16+,21-,22-/m1/s1 Key: PYUXUMSQSVWNDS-NSAJDELNBY
- SMILES: COC1=CC(=O)C(=C(C[C@@]2(C)CC[C@@]3(C)[C@@H](CCC=C3C)[C@H]2C)C1=O)O

Properties
Chemical formula	C_{22}H_{30}O_{4}
Molar mass	358.478 g·mol^{−1}
- Except where otherwise noted, data are given for materials in their standard state (at 25 °C [77 °F], 100 kPa). verify (what is ?) Infobox references

Bolinaquinone is a hydroxyquinone marine metabolite. It is known for having potent anti-inflammatory activity.
