= Delmadinone acetate =

Veterinary progestin and antiandrogen

Clinical data
- Trade names: Tardak, others
- Other names: DMA; RS-1310; 1-Dehydrochlormadinone acetate; 1,6-Didehydro-6-chloro-17α-acetoxyprogesterone; 6-Chloro-17α-hydroxypregna-1,4,6-triene-3,20-dione
- Routes of administration: Intramuscular injection
- Drug class: Progestogen; Progestin; Progestogen ester; Steroidal antiandrogen
- ATCvet code: QG03DX91 (WHO)

Legal status
- Legal status: Veterinary use only

Identifiers
- IUPAC name: [(8R,9S,10R,13S,14S,17R)-17-acetyl-6-chloro-10,13-dimethyl-3-oxo-9,11,12,14,15,16-hexahydro-8H-cyclopenta[a]phenanthren-17-yl] acetate
- CAS Number: 13698-49-2
- PubChem CID: 10135765
- ChemSpider: 8311278
- UNII: 92833M0LD9
- ChEMBL: ChEMBL2104598
- CompTox Dashboard (EPA): DTXSID60160018
- ECHA InfoCard: 100.033.821

Chemical and physical data
- Formula: C_{23}H_{27}ClO_{4}
- Molar mass: 402.92 g·mol^{−1}
- 3D model (JSmol): Interactive image
- SMILES: O=C\1\C=C/[C@]4(C(=C/1)C(\Cl)=C/[C@@H]2[C@@H]4CC[C@@]3([C@@](OC(=O)C)(C(=O)C)CC[C@@H]23)C)C
- InChI: InChI=1S/C23H27ClO4/c1-13(25)23(28-14(2)26)10-7-18-16-12-20(24)19-11-15(27)5-8-21(19,3)17(16)6-9-22(18,23)4/h5,8,11-12,16-18H,6-7,9-10H2,1-4H3/t16-,17+,18+,21-,22+,23+/m1/s1; Key:CGBCCZZJVKUAMX-DFXBJWIESA-N

Delmadinone acetate (DMA), sold under the brand name Tardak among others, is a progestin and antiandrogen used in veterinary medicine to treat androgen-dependent conditions such as benign prostatic hyperplasia in male dogs.

Delmadinone acetate must be used with caution, as it can cause adrenal insufficiency through inhibition of adrenocorticotropic hormone (ACTH) secretion from the pituitary gland.

DMA is the C17α acetate ester of delmadinone, which, in contrast to DMA, was never marketed for medical use.

== Uses ==
=== Veterinary ===
Delmadinone acetate (DMA) is used in veterinary medicine to treat androgen-dependent conditions in animals. Its most common use is for the treatment of benign prostatic hyperplasia in male dogs. It may also be prescribed for managing hypersexuality in male dogs and cats, perianal gland tumors in dogs, and hormone-driven aggression in dogs.

== Pharmacology ==
=== Pharmacodynamics ===
Delmadinone acetate (DMA) is a progestogen with antigonadotropic, and therefore antiandrogenic and antiestrogenic, effects. In addition, DMA binds to the androgen receptor and is thought to act as an antagonist of this receptor, similarly to related drugs such as chlormadinone acetate and osaterone acetate.

== Chemistry ==
Delmadinone acetate (DMA), also known as 1-dehydrochlormadinone acetate, 1,6-didehydro-6-chloro-17α-acetoxyprogesterone, or 6-chloro-17α-hydroxypregna-1,4,6-triene-3,20-dione, is a synthetic pregnane steroid and a derivative of progesterone. It is specifically a 17α-hydroxyprogesterone derivative, characterized by the presence of a chlorine atom at the C6 position, a double bond between the C1 and C2 positions, another double bond between the C6 and C7 positions, and an acetate ester at the C17α position. Structural analogues of DMA include other 17α-hydroxyprogesterone derivatives such as chlormadinone acetate, cyproterone acetate, hydroxyprogesterone caproate, medroxyprogesterone acetate, megestrol acetate, and osaterone acetate.

== History ==
Delmadinone acetate (DMA) was first described in the scientific literature in 1959 and has been marketed since at least 1972. By that time, it was marketed in Europe and the United Kingdom under the brand names Tardak and Zenadrex. It was also under development for use in the United States, but it does not appear to have been marketed there.

== Society and culture ==
=== Generic names ===
Delmadinone acetate is the generic name of the drug and its USAN and BANM. Delmadinone is the INN and BAN of the unesterified free alcohol form.

=== Brand names ===
DMA is most commonly marketed under the brand name Tardak, but has also been sold under several other brand names, including Delmate, Estrex, Tardastren, Tardastrex, Vetadinon, and Zenadrex.

=== Availability ===
DMA is available in Europe and Oceania. It is marketed specifically in the United Kingdom, France, Belgium, Germany, Austria, Switzerland, the Netherlands, Finland, Australia, and New Zealand.
