= Perianal gland tumor =

Dog disease

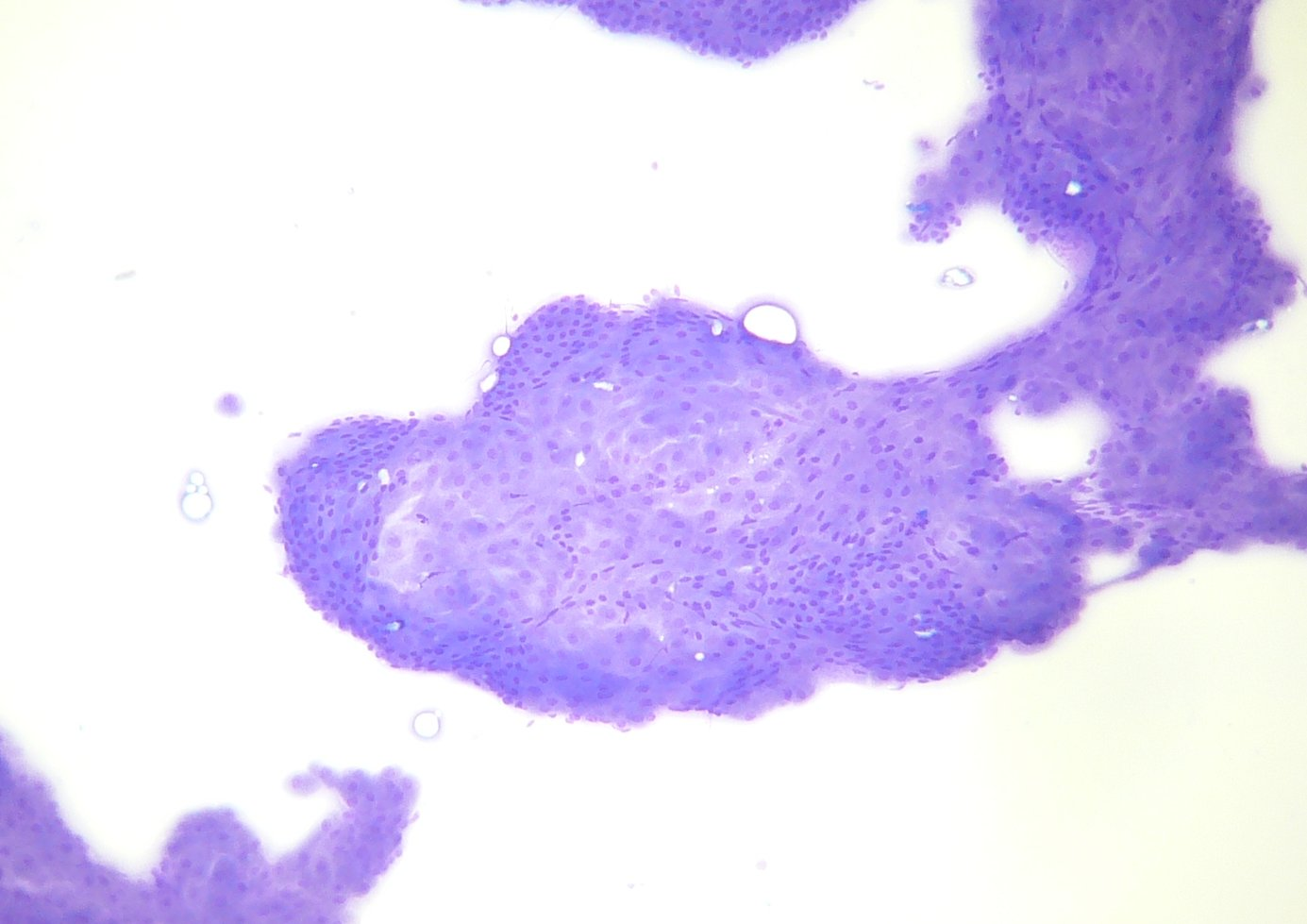
Perianal gland tumor cytology

A perianal gland tumor is a type of tumor found near the anus in dogs that arises from specialized glandular tissue found in the perineum. It is also known as a hepatoid tumor because of the similarity in cell shape to hepatocytes (liver cells). It is most commonly seen in intact dogs and is the third most common tumor type in intact male dogs. There are two types of perianal gland tumors, perianal gland adenomas, which are benign, and perianal gland adenocarcinomas, which are malignant. Both have receptors for testosterone. Perianal gland adenomas are three times more likely to be found in intact male dogs than females, and perianal gland adenocarcinomas are ten times more common in male dogs than females. The most commonly affected breeds for adenomas are the Siberian Husky, Cocker Spaniel, Pekingese, and Samoyed; for adenocarcinomas the most commonly affected breeds are the Siberian Husky, Bulldog, and Alaskan Malamute.

Perianal gland tumors are located most commonly in the skin around the anus, but can also be found on the tail or groin. Adenomas are more common, making up 91 percent of perianal gland tumors in one study. Adenomas and adenocarcinomas look alike, both being round, pink and usually less than three centimeters in width. Adenocarcinomas are more likely to be multiple and invasive into the underlying tissue, and they can metastasize to the lymph nodes, liver, and lungs.

Both types should be removed and sent to a pathologist for identification. However, 95 percent of perianal gland adenomas will disappear after neutering the dog. Removing the tumor and neutering the dog at the same time will help prevent recurrence. Dogs with perianal gland adenocarcinomas should be treated with aggressive surgery and the radiation therapy and chemotherapy if necessary.
