= Cismadinone =

Chemical compound

Clinical data
- Other names: 6α-Chloro-1,2-didehydro-17α-hydroxyprogesterone

Identifiers
- IUPAC name: (1S,2R,8S,10R,11S,14R,15S)-14-acetyl-8-chloro-14-hydroxy-2,15-dimethyltetracyclo[8.7.0.0^{2,7}.0^{11,15}]heptadeca-3,6-dien-5-one
- CAS Number: 54063-31-9
- PubChem CID: 193990
- ChemSpider: 168332
- UNII: O00XM1O6TV
- CompTox Dashboard (EPA): DTXSID10968900

Chemical and physical data
- Formula: C_{21}H_{27}ClO_{3}
- Molar mass: 362.89 g·mol^{−1}
- 3D model (JSmol): Interactive image
- SMILES: CC(=O)C1(CCC2C1(CCC3C2CC(C4=CC(=O)C=CC34C)Cl)C)O
- InChI: InChI=1S/C21H27ClO3/c1-12(23)21(25)9-6-16-14-11-18(22)17-10-13(24)4-7-19(17,2)15(14)5-8-20(16,21)3/h4,7,10,14-16,18,25H,5-6,8-9,11H2,1-3H3/t14-,15+,16+,18+,19-,20+,21+/m1/s1; Key:RNSISAJHBSCDGC-SCUQKFFVSA-N

Cismadinone (INN), also known as 6α-chloro-17α-hydroxypregna-1,4-diene-3,20-dione or 6α-chloro-δ^{1}-dehydro-17α-hydroxyprogesterone, is a steroidal progestin closely related to the 17α-hydroxyprogesterone derivatives that was never marketed. An acetylated form, cismadinone acetate, also exists, but similarly to cismadinone, was never marketed.
