= Delmadinone =

Chemical compound

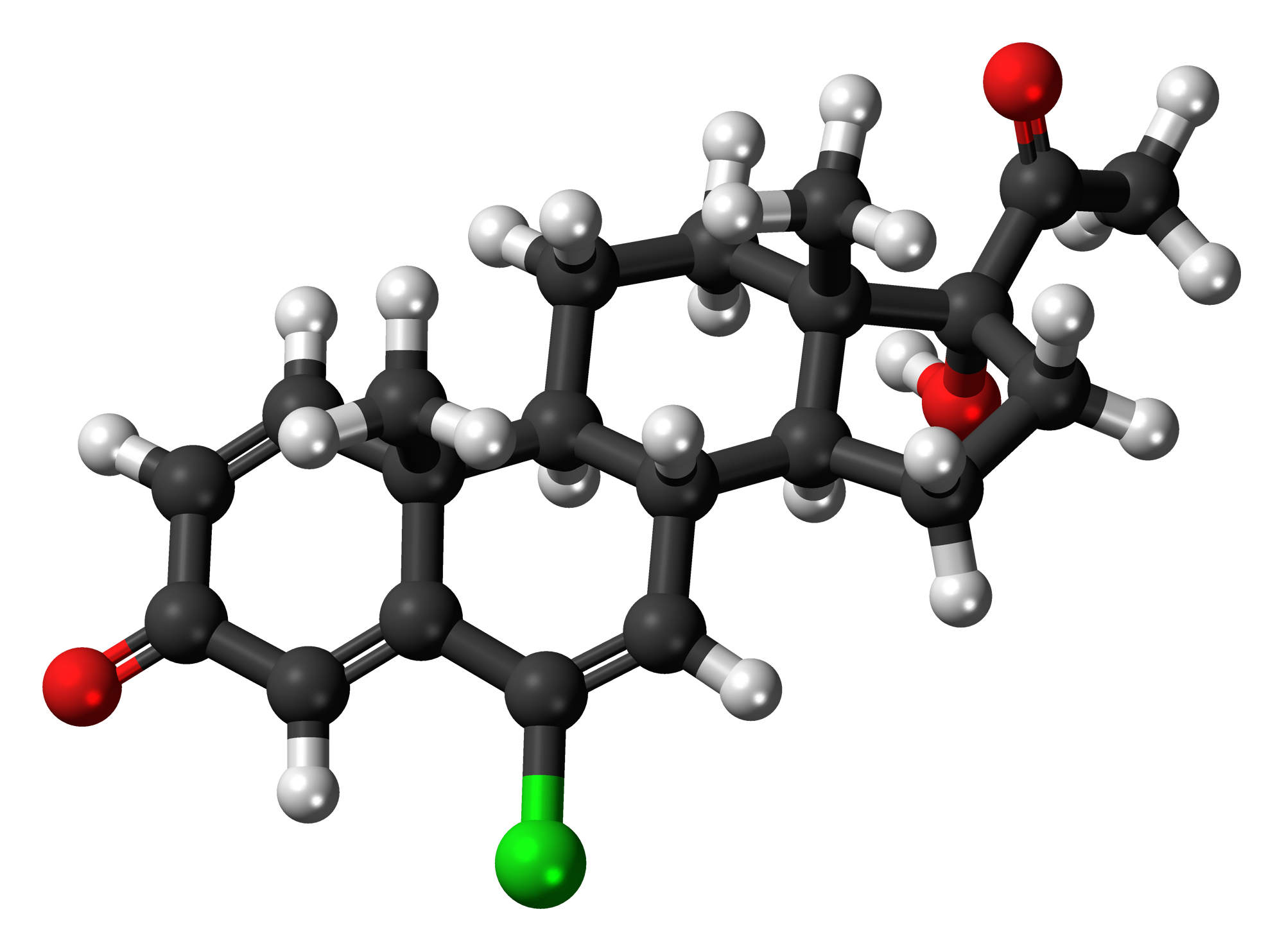

Clinical data
- ATCvet code: QG03DX91 (WHO)

Identifiers
- IUPAC name: 6-chloro-17-hydroxypregna-1,4,6-triene-3,20-dione
- CAS Number: 15262-77-8
- PubChem CID: 10428639
- ChemSpider: 8604067
- UNII: WFF40U3U3O
- CompTox Dashboard (EPA): DTXSID60165088
- ECHA InfoCard: 100.035.717

Chemical and physical data
- Formula: C_{21}H_{25}ClO_{3}
- Molar mass: 360.88 g·mol^{−1}
- 3D model (JSmol): Interactive image
- SMILES: O=C\1\C=C/[C@]4(C(=C/1)C(\Cl)=C/[C@@H]2[C@@H]4CC[C@@]3([C@@](O)(C(=O)C)CC[C@@H]23)C)C
- InChI: InChI=1S/C21H25ClO3/c1-12(23)21(25)9-6-16-14-11-18(22)17-10-13(24)4-7-19(17,2)15(14)5-8-20(16,21)3/h4,7,10-11,14-16,25H,5-6,8-9H2,1-3H3/t14-,15+,16+,19-,20+,21+/m1/s1; Key:ZSAMZEYLGUEVJW-TTYLFXKOSA-N

Delmadinone (INN) is a steroidal progestin which was never marketed. An acylated derivative, delmadinone acetate, is used in veterinary medicine.

While delmadinone is sometimes used as a synonym for delmadinone acetate, it usually refers to delmadinone acetate, not delmadinone.

== See also ==
- Delmadinone acetate
