= Progesterone 3-acetyl enol ether =

Chemical compound

Clinical data
- Other names: Progesterone acetate; Progesterone 3-acetate; 3-Acetoxypregna-3,5-diene-20-one; 20-Oxopregna-3,5-dien-3-yl acetate; 3,5-Progesterol acetate; NSC-124740
- Drug class: Progestogen; Progestogen ether

Identifiers
- IUPAC name: [(8S,9S,10R,13S,14S,17S)-17-Acetyl-10,13-dimethyl-2,7,8,9,11,12,14,15,16,17-decahydro-1H-cyclopenta[a]phenanthren-3-yl] acetate
- CAS Number: 4954-06-7
- PubChem CID: 134580
- ChemSpider: 118613
- UNII: 7RB32A7QSD

Chemical and physical data
- Formula: C_{23}H_{32}O_{3}
- Molar mass: 356.506 g·mol^{−1}
- 3D model (JSmol): Interactive image
- SMILES: CC(=O)[C@H]1CC[C@@H]2[C@@]1(CC[C@H]3[C@H]2CC=C4[C@@]3(CCC(=C4)OC(=O)C)C)C
- InChI: InChI=1S/C23H32O3/c1-14(24)19-7-8-20-18-6-5-16-13-17(26-15(2)25)9-11-22(16,3)21(18)10-12-23(19,20)4/h5,13,18-21H,6-12H2,1-4H3/t18-,19+,20-,21-,22-,23+/m0/s1; Key:YIPYJRPRHUJJDP-WKOLOUIMSA-N

Progesterone 3-acetyl enol ether, also known as progesterone acetate, as well as 3-acetoxypregna-3,5-dien-20-one, is a progestin which was never marketed. It was reported to possess similar potency to progesterone and hydroxyprogesterone caproate in the rabbit endometrial carbonic anhydrase test, a bioassay of progestogenic activity. In addition, it was able to maintain pregnancy in animals. Progesterone 3-acetyl enol ether is closely related to quingestrone, which is also known as progesterone 3-cyclopentyl enol ether and was formerly marketed as an oral contraceptive.

The 3-acetyl ether may be cleaved from progesterone 3-acetyl enol ether in vivo and, based on its chemical structure, this may result in the transformation of progesterone 3-acetyl enol ether into 3α-dihydroprogesterone and/or 3β-dihydroprogesterone. 3β-Dihydroprogesterone has been reported to possess about the same progestogenic potency as progesterone in the Clauberg test, whereas 3α-dihydroprogesterone was not assessed.

The C3 enol ethers of progesterone are less suited for use via depot injection relative to progestogen esters like hydroxyprogesterone caproate due to their susceptibility to oxidative metabolism.

== See also ==
- Progestogen ester § Progestogen ethers
- List of progestogen esters § Ethers of progesterone derivatives
