= Pentarane A =

Chemical compound

Clinical data
- Other names: D'6-Pentarane; Pregna-D'6-pentarane; 16α,17α-Cyclohexanoprogesterone; 16α,17α-Tetramethylenepregn-4-ene-3,20-dione; 17α-Acetyl-16β,24-cyclo-21-norchol-4-en-3-one

Identifiers
- IUPAC name: (4aR,4bS,6aS,6bS,10aR,11aS,11bR)-6b-Acetyl-4a,6a-dimethyl-4,4b,5,6,7,8,9,10,10a,11,11a,11b,12,13-tetradecahydro-3H-indeno[2,1-a]phenanthren-2-one
- CAS Number: 38522-51-9
- PubChem CID: 189105
- ChemSpider: 164309
- UNII: UMG87A58PN
- CompTox Dashboard (EPA): DTXSID20959389

Chemical and physical data
- Formula: C_{25}H_{36}O_{2}
- Molar mass: 368.561 g·mol^{−1}
- 3D model (JSmol): Interactive image
- SMILES: CC(=O)[C@@]12CCCC[C@@H]1C[C@@H]3[C@@]2(CC[C@H]4[C@H]3CCC5=CC(=O)CC[C@]45C)C
- InChI: InChI=1S/C25H36O2/c1-16(26)25-11-5-4-6-18(25)15-22-20-8-7-17-14-19(27)9-12-23(17,2)21(20)10-13-24(22,25)3/h14,18,20-22H,4-13,15H2,1-3H3/t18-,20-,21+,22+,23+,24+,25+/m1/s1; Key:QRVBGQLTPQQFJY-IEHCJHDVSA-N

Pentarane A, also known as D'6-pentarane or pregna-D'6-pentarane, as well as 16α,17α-cyclohexanoprogesterone, 16α,17α-tetramethylenepregn-4-ene-3,20-dione, or 17α-acetyl-16β,24-cyclo-21-norchol-4-en-3-one, is a steroidal progestin that was developed by the Zelinskii Institute of Organic Chemistry of the Russian Academy of Sciences and was never marketed. The 6α-methylated analogue of pentarane A is known as mecigestone or as pentarane B.

== See also ==
- Acetomepregenol
- List of Russian drugs
