= Ilimaquinone =

Chemical compound

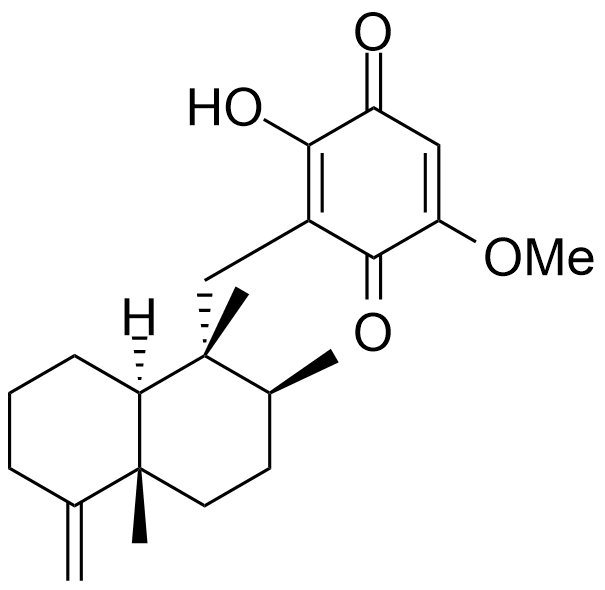
- Skeletal formula of ilimaquinone

Names
- Preferred IUPAC name 3-[[(1R,2S,4aS,8aS)-1,2,4a-trimethyl-5-methylidene-3,4,6,7,8,8a-hexahydro-2H-naphthalen-1-yl]methyl]-2-hydroxy-5-methoxycyclohexa-2,5-diene-1,4-dione

Identifiers
CAS Number	71678-03-0
3D model (JSmol)	Interactive image
ChEBI	CHEBI:70133
ChEMBL	ChEMBL155085
ChemSpider	65243
PubChem CID	72291
UNII	5U0WAN3N8Q
CompTox Dashboard (EPA)	DTXSID90221909
- InChI: InChI=1S/C22H30O4/c1-13-7-6-8-18-21(13,3)10-9-14(2)22(18,4)12-15-19(24)16(23)11-17(26-5)20(15)25/h11,14,18,24H,1,6-10,12H2,2-5H3/t14-,18+,21+,22+/m0/s1 Key: JJWITJNSXCXULM-YVUMSICPSA-N
- SMILES: C([C@@]1(C)[C@]2([C@](C)(CC[C@@H]1C)C(=C)CCC2)[H])C=3C(=O)C(OC)=CC(=O)C3O

Properties
Chemical formula	C_{22}H_{30}O_{4}
Molar mass	358.478 g·mol^{−1}
- Except where otherwise noted, data are given for materials in their standard state (at 25 °C [77 °F], 100 kPa). Infobox references

Ilimaquinone is a bioactive marine natural product belonging to the class of sesquiterpene quinones. It was first isolated in 1979 from the marine sponge Hippospongia metachromia. Since then, it has also been identified in other marine sponges, including Dactylospongia elegans and Halichondria species. The compound features a 4,9-friedodrimane skeleton, containing four stereocenters, that is linked via a methyl bridge to a 2,5-dioxygenated benzoquinone.

Ilimaquinone has attracted interest in natural products and drug discovery research, owing to its diverse biological activities, which include antiproliferative, antiviral, and herbicidal effects. The originally reported structure of ilimaquinone contained an incorrect stereochemical assignment, which was revised in 1987 by Capon and colleagues through spectroscopic analysis.

== Physicochemical characterization ==
Ilimaquinone belongs to the class of merosesquiterpene quinones, a subgroup of sesquiterpene quinones. Sesquiterpenes are terpene compounds with a C15 carbon skeleton, composed of three isoprene units. The prefix "mero-" indicates that the molecule is assembled from structurally distinct biosynthetic building blocks. In the case of ilimaquinone, the sesquiterpene core is linked to a methoxy- and hydroxy-substituted 1,4-benzoquinone ring, which places it within the sesquiterpene quinone family.

The chemical reactivity of ilimaquinone is primarily associated with its benzoquinone ring, which operates through two main mechanisms that largely account for the compound's biological activity. First, the quinone moiety can participate in redox cycling. In biological systems, ilimaquinone can be reduced via single-electron transfer to its semiquinone form, a process mediated by cellular reductants such as NAD(P)H or glutathione. Subsequent reoxidation to the quinone can generate reactive oxygen species (ROS), including peroxide, hydroxyl, or superoxide ions. This redox cycling contributes to oxidative stress, which influences cellular signaling pathways and can induce apoptosis.

The second mode of reactivity involves nucleophilic addition at the electrophilic positions of the quinone ring, typically via a Michael addition. Strongly nucleophilic cellular components, particularly free thiol groups in cysteine residues of proteins or in glutathione, can react with ilimaquinone in this way. Such covalent modifications may lead to the inactivation of enzymatic functions or interfere with regulatory protein–protein interactions.

In addition, the quinone ring acts as a chromophore: its conjugated system is responsible for the characteristic red color of ilimaquinone.
