= Chlormethenmadinone acetate =

Chemical compound

Clinical data
- Trade names: Biogest, Sterolibrin, Antigest B, Agelin
- Other names: SCH-12600; 6-Chloromethylenedehydroacetoxyprogesterone; 17α-Acetoxy-6-chloro-16-methylene-6-dehydroprogesterone; 16-Methylenechlormadinone acetate; 17α-Acetoxy-6-chloro-16-methylenepregna-4,6-diene-3,20-dione
- Drug class: Progestogen; Progestin; Progestogen ester

Identifiers
- IUPAC name: [(8R,9S,10R,13S,14S,17R)-17-Acetyl-6-chloro-10,13-dimethyl-16-methylidene-3-oxo-1,2,8,9,11,12,14,15-octahydrocyclopenta[a]phenanthren-17-yl] acetate
- CAS Number: 6799-23-1
- PubChem CID: 175513
- ChemSpider: 152916
- ChEMBL: ChEMBL3276150
- CompTox Dashboard (EPA): DTXSID00987408

Chemical and physical data
- Formula: C_{24}H_{29}ClO_{4}
- Molar mass: 416.94 g·mol^{−1}
- 3D model (JSmol): Interactive image
- SMILES: CC(=O)[C@]1(C(=C)C[C@@H]2[C@@]1(CC[C@H]3[C@H]2C=C(C4=CC(=O)CC[C@]34C)Cl)C)OC(=O)C
- InChI: InChI=1S/C24H29ClO4/c1-13-10-19-17-12-21(25)20-11-16(28)6-8-22(20,4)18(17)7-9-23(19,5)24(13,14(2)26)29-15(3)27/h11-12,17-19H,1,6-10H2,2-5H3/t17-,18+,19+,22-,23+,24+/m1/s1; Key:MDTBKPVVPCIBIT-USYNNDFZSA-N

Chlormethenmadinone acetate (CMMA), also known as chlorsuperlutin, is a progestin medication which was developed in Czechoslovakia in the 1960s. It has been used in combination with mestranol in birth control pills under the brand names Biogest, Sterolibrin, and Antigest B, and in veterinary medicine under the brand name Agelin. Analogues of CMMA include bromethenmadinone acetate (bromsuperlutin), which was assessed but was never marketed, and melengestrol acetate (methylsuperlutin), which is used in veterinary medicine.

== See also ==
- List of progestogen esters § Esters of 17α-hydroxyprogesterone derivatives
- 16-Methylene-17α-hydroxyprogesterone acetate
