= Natural growth promoter =

Natural growth promoters (NGPs) are feed additives for farm animals.

== Definition ==
Different categories of feed additives for farm animals are referred to as natural growth promoters (NGPs) or non-antibiotic growth promoters. They are commonly regarded as favorable alternatives to antibiotic growth promoters (AGPs) in livestock production.

== Categories ==
NGPs include predominantly organic acids, probiotics, prebiotics, synbiotics, phytogenics, tannins, feed enzymes and immune stimulants., An ongoing search for alternatives has created a large variety of NGPs for pigs, poultry, ruminants and aquatic species.

== General benefits ==
The main advantage of NGPs over AGPs is that they do usually not bear any risk regarding bacterial resistance or undesired residues in animal products such as meat, milk or eggs. Addition of NGPs to feeds of farm animals may have a number of beneficial effects, including:

- rapid development of a healthy gut microflora
- stabilization of digestion
- increased growth performance
- stimulation and rapid maturation of the immune system
- reduced incidence of diarrhea
- improved feed efficiency
- lower mortality rates
- higher profitability

== Mode of action ==
=== Acidifiers ===
Acidifiers, such as organic acids or their salts, are used to prevent microbial degradation of raw materials or finished feeds, especially under poor storage conditions (e.g. high moisture content, high levels of contamination with molds). Moreover, acidifiers may improve growth performance through establishment of low gastrointestinal pH conditions which support endogenous digestive enzymes and reduce undesired gut microorganisms. Many dietary acidifiers are based on propionic acid, formic acid, lactic acid and others, either as single components or in combination. Some acidifiers also contain inorganic acids (e.g. phosphoric acid).

=== Probiotics ===
Probiotics are live microorganisms or viable spores which support the development of a beneficial gut microflora. Probiotic bacteria (e.g. from the genera Lactobacillus, Bifidobacterium, Enterococcus) counteract undesired microorganisms such as Salmonella or E. coli by blocking receptors on the gut wall, production of antimicrobial substances or activation of the immune system.

=== Prebiotics ===
Prebiotics are carbohydrates which are indigestible for the host animal. On the other hand, they are selectively fermented by beneficial gut bacteria and, therefore, support a healthy gut microflora. These include fructose oligosaccharides (FOS) including inulin, transgalactose oligosaccharides (GOS), xylooligosaccharides (XOS) and soy oligosaccharides such as stachyose, verbose and raffinose. Mannan oligosaccharides are sometimes included as prebiotics but are not fermentable. This was confirmed by Smiricky-Tjardes et al. at the University of Illinois and so might be more appropriately termed immunosaccharides since they act as decoys for pathogen attachment (Salmonella and E. Coli) and result in increased immunoglobulins (IgAs) at intestinal level.

=== Synbiotics ===
Combined administration of probiotics and prebiotics, referred to as synbiotics, is supposed to cause synergistic effects in terms of gut health and performance.

=== Phytogenics ===
Phytogenics are derived from herbs, spices or aromatic plants and have shown antimicrobial, antifungal, antiviral, antioxidant or sedative properties. They are known for their appetizing effects, since they increase the palatability of the feed and stimulate endogenous digestive enzymes. Moreover, phytogenics have a pronounced impact on the gut microflora.

=== Tannins ===
Tannins are polyphenolic compounds produced by plants, ranging in concentrations from <2% to more than 20% of dry weight and may protect plants from herbivore, increase resistance against pathogens, or protect tissues such as wood against decay. In-vitro and in-vivo results suggest that two of the most abundant and common source of tannins, chestnut (Castanea sativa; hydrolyzable tannins) and quebracho (Schinopsis lorentzii, condensed tannins) extracts, are effective to reduce and control infection. Moreover are considered a natural alternative to AGPs due to the difficulty of bacteria to develop resistance against the diverse range of molecules that contain these plant compounds.

=== Feed enzymes ===
Animal feeds contain varying levels of indigestible nutrients and undesired components such as fiber, phytate or proteins with antigenic effects. Different feed enzymes such as, carbohydrases, phytases or proteases, can be included in feeds to improve the use of energy and nutrients or to degrade several undesired components. Moreover, some enzymes (e.g. amylases, lipases) can be added to the feed of young animals in order to support the endogenous enzyme secretions.

=== Immune stimulants ===
Different feed additives may function as stimulator or modulator of immunity processes. Specific cell wall fragments from bacteria or yeasts or sea algae may induce activation of immune cells (e.g. macrophages, lymphocytes).
