= Gestonorone acetate =

Chemical compound

Clinical data
- Other names: Gestronol acetate; Norhydroxyprogesterone acetate; 17α-Hydroxy-19-norprogesterone 17α-acetate; 17α-Acetoxy-19-norprogesterone; 17α-Hydroxy-19-norpregn-4-ene-3,20-dione 17α-acetate
- Drug class: Progestin; Progestogen

Identifiers
- IUPAC name: [(8R,9S,10R,13S,14S,17R)-17-Acetyl-13-methyl-3-oxo-1,2,6,7,8,9,10,11,12,14,15,16-dodecahydrocyclopenta[a]phenanthren-17-yl] acetate
- CAS Number: 31981-44-9
- PubChem CID: 134963
- ChemSpider: 118930
- UNII: D9R4KSN7NA
- CompTox Dashboard (EPA): DTXSID90953874
- ECHA InfoCard: 100.046.242

Chemical and physical data
- Formula: C_{22}H_{30}O_{4}
- Molar mass: 358.478 g·mol^{−1}
- 3D model (JSmol): Interactive image
- SMILES: CC(=O)[C@]1(CC[C@@H]2[C@@]1(CC[C@H]3[C@H]2CCC4=CC(=O)CC[C@H]34)C)OC(=O)C
- InChI: InChI=1S/C22H30O4/c1-13(23)22(26-14(2)24)11-9-20-19-6-4-15-12-16(25)5-7-17(15)18(19)8-10-21(20,22)3/h12,17-20H,4-11H2,1-3H3/t17-,18+,19+,20-,21-,22-/m0/s1; Key:MTSLFKWJINJVBO-ZCPXKWAGSA-N

Gestonorone acetate, or gestronol acetate, also known as norhydroxyprogesterone acetate, is a progestin of the 19-norprogesterone and 17α-hydroxyprogesterone groups which was developed in the early 1960s but was never marketed. It is the C17α acetate ester of gestronol (17α-hydroxy-19-norprogesterone).

Gestonorone acetate has been found to consistently inhibit ovulation at an oral dosage of 10 mg/day in combination with 50 μg/day oral ethinylestradiol. Weak or no endometrial effects were observed at an oral dosage of 100 mg/day, basal vacuoles appeared at 130 to 140 mg/day, and full endometrial secretory transformation occurred at 220 mg/day.

== See also ==
- Gestonorone caproate
