= Pentagestrone acetate =

Chemical compound

Clinical data
- Trade names: Gestovis, Gestovister
- Other names: PGA; Gestovis; 17α-Acetoxyprogesterone 3-cyclopentyl enol ether
- Routes of administration: By mouth
- Drug class: Progestogen; Progestin; Progestogen ether; Progestogen ester

Identifiers
- IUPAC name: [(8R,9S,10R,13S,14S,17R)-17-acetyl-3-cyclopentyloxy-10,13-dimethyl-1,2,7,8,9,11,12,14,15,16-decahydrocyclopenta[a]phenanthren-17-yl] acetate
- CAS Number: 1178-60-5
- PubChem CID: 10321047
- ChemSpider: 8496511
- UNII: 3Y30374T6H
- CompTox Dashboard (EPA): DTXSID701017067

Chemical and physical data
- Formula: C_{28}H_{40}O_{4}
- Molar mass: 440.624 g·mol^{−1}
- 3D model (JSmol): Interactive image
- SMILES: CC(=O)C1(CCC2C1(CCC3C2CC=C4C3(CCC(=C4)OC5CCCC5)C)C)OC(=O)C
- InChI: InChI=1S/C28H40O4/c1-18(29)28(32-19(2)30)16-13-25-23-10-9-20-17-22(31-21-7-5-6-8-21)11-14-26(20,3)24(23)12-15-27(25,28)4/h9,17,21,23-25H,5-8,10-16H2,1-4H3/t23-,24+,25+,26+,27+,28+/m1/s1; Key:NSRLWNNZHGRGJS-JVACCQEYSA-N

Pentagestrone acetate (PGA), sold under the brand names Gestovis and Gestovister, is a progestin which was described in the literature in 1960 and was introduced by Vister in Italy in 1961. It is the 3-cyclopentyl enol ether of 17α-hydroxyprogesterone acetate. PGA, along with quingestrone (the 3-cyclopentyl enol ether of progesterone), is said to have very similar properties to those of dydrogesterone, a pure progestogen and close analogue of progesterone.

PGA is orally active, was provided in 10 and 20 mg capsules, and has been used to treat habitual abortion and menstrual disorders at a dosage of 10 to 20 mg/day. It has been said to have equivalent potency to intramuscular progesterone. The combination of 20 mg/day PGA and 100 μg/day mestranol is an effective ovulation inhibitor in women. The effective dosage of PGA in the menstrual delay test has been studied.

== Chemistry ==
PGA, also known as 17α-acetoxyprogesterone 3-cyclopentyl enol ether, is a synthetic pregnane steroid and a derivative of progesterone and 17α-hydroxyprogesterone.

== See also ==
- Pentagestrone
- Progesterone 3-acetyl enol ether
- Quingestrone
