= Mecigestone =

Chemical compound

Clinical data
- Other names: Pentarane B; 6α-Methyl-16α,17α-cyclohexanoprogesterone

Identifiers
- IUPAC name: (4aR,4bS,6aS,6bS,10aR,11aS,11bR,13S)-6b-Acetyl-4a,6a,13-trimethyl-4,4b,5,6,7,8,9,10,10a,11,11a,11b,12,13-tetradecahydro-3H-indeno[2,1-a]phenanthren-2-one
- CAS Number: 58212-84-3
- PubChem CID: 124372
- ChemSpider: 110790
- UNII: N3UWJ2K7NF
- CompTox Dashboard (EPA): DTXSID30973778

Chemical and physical data
- Formula: C_{26}H_{38}O_{2}
- Molar mass: 382.588 g·mol^{−1}
- 3D model (JSmol): Interactive image
- SMILES: C[C@H]1C[C@@H]2[C@H](CC[C@]3([C@H]2C[C@@H]4[C@]3(CCCC4)C(=O)C)C)[C@@]5(C1=CC(=O)CC5)C
- InChI: InChI=1S/C26H38O2/c1-16-13-20-21(24(3)11-8-19(28)15-22(16)24)9-12-25(4)23(20)14-18-7-5-6-10-26(18,25)17(2)27/h15-16,18,20-21,23H,5-14H2,1-4H3/t16-,18+,20+,21-,23-,24+,25-,26-/m0/s1; Key:OAICPORQJIVREU-SGCXAXHESA-N

Mecigestone, also known as pentarane B, as well as 6α-methyl-16α,17α-cyclohexanoprogesterone, 6α-methylcyclohexano[1',2';16,17]pregn-4-ene-3,20-dione, or 17α-acetyl-6α-methyl-16β,24-cyclo-21-norchol-4-en-3-one, is a steroidal progestin that was developed by the Zelinskii Institute of Organic Chemistry of the Russian Academy of Sciences and has been proposed for clinical use as a progestogen but has not been marketed. It is the 6α-methylated analogue of pentarane A, which is also known as D'6-pentarane or pregna-D'6-pentarane.

== Synthesis ==
The synthesis has been reported: Patent: Precursor: Micronization technology:

- The Diels-Alder reaction of 16-DPA [979-02-2] (1) with butadiene gives PC99565806 (2). It is important to recognize that for mecigestone the stereochemistry about the E-ring is cis and not trans. The trans isomer is PC99565808.
- Ex 1: Epoxidation of the olefin with ethereal Monoperphthalic acid [2311-91-3] occurs to give (3). A search of the pubchem registry only gave the trans configuration about the E-ring (PC11873237), and not the expected cis stereochemistry.
- The reaction with methyl magnesium iodide occurs with a regioselectivity to the 6 position from the beta face. Saponification of the acetate ester also occurs during the work-up to give (4).
- The Jones oxidation leads to the enone of the finished product. Epimerization of the beta-methyl group also occurred during this step. Thus, completing the synthesis of mecigestone (5).

== See also ==
- Acetomepregenol
- List of Russian drugs
