= Quingestrone =

Progestin medication

Clinical data
- Trade names: Enol-Luteovis
- Other names: W-3399; Progesterone 3-cyclopentyl enol ether; PCPE; 3-Cyclopentyloxypregna-3,5-dien-20-one
- Routes of administration: By mouth
- Drug class: Progestogen; Progestin; Progestogen ether; Neurosteroid
- ATC code: G03A (WHO)

Legal status
- Legal status: In general: ℞ (Prescription only)

Identifiers
- IUPAC name: 1-[(8S,9S,10R,13S,14S,17S)-3-cyclopentyloxy-10,13-dimethyl-2,7,8,9,11,12,14,15,16,17-decahydro-1H-cyclopenta[a]phenanthren-17-yl]ethanone
- CAS Number: 67-95-8
- PubChem CID: 9929903
- ChemSpider: 8105534
- UNII: 0612VZ9I5Z
- KEGG: D05680
- ChEMBL: ChEMBL2104568
- CompTox Dashboard (EPA): DTXSID00217196

Chemical and physical data
- Formula: C_{26}H_{38}O_{2}
- Molar mass: 382.588 g·mol^{−1}
- 3D model (JSmol): Interactive image
- SMILES: CC(=O)C1CCC2C1(CCC3C2CC=C4C3(CCC(=C4)OC5CCCC5)C)C
- InChI: InChI=1S/C26H38O2/c1-17(27)22-10-11-23-21-9-8-18-16-20(28-19-6-4-5-7-19)12-14-25(18,2)24(21)13-15-26(22,23)3/h8,16,19,21-24H,4-7,9-15H2,1-3H3/t21-,22+,23-,24-,25-,26+/m0/s1; Key:XAVRSHOUEXATJE-FBQZJRKBSA-N

Quingestrone, also known as progesterone 3-cyclopentyl enol ether (PCPE) and sold under the brand name Enol-Luteovis, is a progestin medication which was previously used in birth control pills in Italy but is now no longer marketed. It is taken by mouth.

Quingestrone is a progestin, or a synthetic progestogen, and hence is an agonist of the progesterone receptor, the biological target of progestogens like progesterone. It has weak glucocorticoid activity.

Quingestrone was introduced for medical use by 1962. It is no longer available.

== Medical uses ==
Quingestrone was formerly used in combination with ethinylestradiol or mestranol in combined birth control pills in Italy. The medication was studied in the clinical prevention of miscarriage during pregnancy, but insufficient efficacy was observed at the dosage assessed (100 mg/day orally).

== Pharmacology ==
=== Pharmacodynamics ===
Along with the retroprogesterone derivative dydrogesterone, quingestrone has been described as a "true" progesterone derivative or progestogen due to its close similarity to natural progesterone. Similarly to progesterone, dydrogesterone, and hydroxyprogesterone caproate, quingestrone is a pure progestogen and lacks any androgenic effects. As such, it poses no risk of androgenic side effects or virilizing teratogenic effects on female fetuses. Quingestrone is said to influence the hypothalamic–pituitary–adrenal axis similarly to progesterone and medroxyprogesterone acetate, producing adrenal suppression at sufficiently high doses, and this suggests that it possesses weak glucocorticoid activity similarly to progesterone.

Quingestrone is a very weak progestogen. When administered orally or intraperitoneally in animals, the medication showed 1/80 and 1/20 the potency of subcutaneously injected progesterone, respectively. Similarly, oral doses of quingestrone of 10 to 20 times those of subcutaneous progesterone were insufficient to maintain pregnancy in animals, and oral or intraperitoneal doses of quingestrone 20 to 40 times those of oral or intraperitoneal progesterone were unable to potentiate hexobarbital-induced anesthesia in animals (which progesterone does and is thought to do by inhibiting the hepatic metabolism of barbiturates). With oral administration of equal doses of progesterone and quingestrone in animals, 3 to 4 times less pregnanediol was recovered from urine with quingestrone. The fact that quingestrone is more potent by intraperitoneal than oral administration in animals suggests that it is transformed into a less active metabolite in the intestines.

The effective dosage of quingestrone in the menstrual delay test has been studied.

Quingestrone has no anesthetic effect in animals, in contrast to progesterone.

=== Pharmacokinetics ===
Quingestrone has been suggested to act as a prodrug of progesterone via slow hydrolysis in the body. Indeed, it produces similar metabolites (e.g., pregnanediols and allopregnanediols) as progesterone, although with differing ratios, and notably is the only progestin that is known to produce pregnanediol as a metabolite. Subsequent research has cast doubt on the notion that quingestrone is a prodrug of progesterone however, and indicates that it instead is directly metabolized into pregnanediols without intermediate conversion into progesterone. Based on its chemical structure, quingestrone may be transformed into 3α-dihydroprogesterone and/or 3β-dihydroprogesterone and then further metabolized into pregnanolones and pregnanediols. 3β-Dihydroprogesterone has been reported to possess about the same progestogenic potency as progesterone in the Clauberg test, whereas 3α-dihydroprogesterone was not assessed.

Relative to progesterone, quingestrone shows improved pharmacokinetics, including higher potency, oral activity, and a longer terminal half-life and hence duration of action. This is considered to be due to its higher lipophilicity, being stored into and slowly released from fat. Quingestrone also shows slower metabolism and more stable blood levels, with a longer time to peak concentrations and a less intense peak compared to progesterone. The bioavailability of quingestrone is highest when it is given as a sesame seed oil solution (compared to an oil suspension (~2-fold less) or micronization (~7-fold less)).

The C3 enol ethers of progesterone are less suited for use via depot injection relative to progestogen esters like hydroxyprogesterone caproate due to their susceptibility to oxidative metabolism.

The pharmacokinetics of quingestrone have been reviewed.

== Chemistry ==
Quingestrone, also known as progesterone 3-cyclopentyl enol ether (PCPE) or as 3-cyclopentyloxypregna-3,5-dien-20-one, is a synthetic pregnane steroid and a derivative of progesterone. It is specifically the 3-cyclopentyl enol ether of progesterone. Quingestrone is closely related to progesterone 3-acetyl enol ether and pentagestrone acetate (17α-acetoxyprogesterone 3-cyclopentyl enol ether).

=== Synthesis ===
Chemical syntheses of quingestrone have been published.

== History ==
Quingestrone appears to have been first synthesized in 1936. It was introduced for medical use in Italy by 1962.

== Society and culture ==
=== Generic names ===
Quingestrone is the generic name of the drug and its INN and USAN. It is also known by its developmental code name W-3399.

=== Brand names ===
Quingestrone was marketed under the brand name Enol-Luteovis.

=== Availability ===
Quingestrone is no longer marketed and hence is no longer available in any country. It was previously available in Italy.
