= Acetomepregenol =

Chemical compound

Clinical data
- Trade names: Diamol
- Other names: ACM; Mepregenol diacetate; Diamol; Megestrol diacetate; Megestrol 3β,17α-diacetate; 3β,17α-Diacetoxy-6-methylpregna-4,6-dien-20-one; 6-Methylpregna-4,6-dien-3β,17α-diol-20-one diacetate
- Drug class: Progestogen; Progestin; Progestogen ester

Identifiers
- IUPAC name: [(3S,8R,9S,10R,13S,14S,17R)-17-acetyl-17-acetyloxy-6,10,13-trimethyl-1,2,3,8,9,11,12,14,15,16-decahydrocyclopenta[a]phenanthren-3-yl] acetate
- CAS Number: 3116-07-2
- PubChem CID: 197015
- ChemSpider: 170630
- UNII: 1JI0G99BDO
- CompTox Dashboard (EPA): DTXSID40953248

Chemical and physical data
- Formula: C_{26}H_{36}O_{5}
- Molar mass: 428.569 g·mol^{−1}
- 3D model (JSmol): Interactive image
- SMILES: CC1=CC2C(CCC3(C2CCC3(C(=O)C)OC(=O)C)C)C4(C1=CC(CC4)OC(=O)C)C
- InChI: InChI=1S/C26H36O5/c1-15-13-20-21(24(5)10-7-19(14-23(15)24)30-17(3)28)8-11-25(6)22(20)9-12-26(25,16(2)27)31-18(4)29/h13-14,19-22H,7-12H2,1-6H3/t19-,20+,21-,22-,24+,25-,26-/m0/s1; Key:SDHHPVPFUVQWKY-AVHYYFBHSA-N

Acetomepregenol (ACM), also known as mepregenol diacetate and sold under the brand name Diamol, is a progestin medication which is used in Russia for the treatment of gynecological conditions and as a method of birth control in combination with an estrogen. It has also been studied in the treatment of threatened abortion. It has been used in veterinary medicine as well. It has been marketed since at least 1981.

== Pharmacology ==
Based on its chemical structure, specifically the lack of a C3 ketone, it is probable that acetomepregenol is a prodrug of megestrol acetate (the 3-keto analogue).

== Chemistry ==
Acetomepregenol, also known as megestrol 3β,17α-diacetate, as well as 3β-dihydro-6-dehydro-6-methyl-17α-hydroxyprogesterone diacetate or as 3β,17α-diacetoxy-6-methylpregna-4,6-dien-20-one, is a synthetic pregnane steroid and a derivative of progesterone and 17α-hydroxyprogesterone. It is very close to megestrol acetate (6-dehydro-6-methyl-17α-acetoxyprogesterone) in structure, except that there is a hydroxyl group with an acetate ester attached at the C3 position instead of a ketone. A closely related medication is cymegesolate (also known as megestrol 3β-cypionate 17α-acetate), which, in contrast, has not been marketed.

== See also ==
- List of Russian drugs
