= Progestogen ester =

Drug class

Progesterone, the prototypical progestogen and the base compound of progestins and progestogen esters.

A progestogen ester is an ester of a progestogen or progestin (a synthetic progestogen). The prototypical progestogen is progesterone, an endogenous sex hormone. Esterification is frequently employed to improve the pharmacokinetics of steroids, including oral bioavailability, lipophilicity, and elimination half-life. In addition, with intramuscular injection, steroid esters are often absorbed more slowly into the body, allowing for less frequent administration. Many (though not all) steroid esters function as prodrugs.

Esterification is particularly salient in the case of progesterone because progesterone itself shows very poor oral pharmacokinetics and is thus ineffective when taken orally. Unmodified, it has an elimination half-life of only 5 minutes, and is almost completely inactivated by the liver during first-pass metabolism. Micronization, however, has allowed for progesterone to be effective orally, although oral micronized progesterone was not developed until recent years.

Examples of important progestogen esters include the 17α-hydroxyprogesterone derivatives medroxyprogesterone acetate, megestrol acetate, cyproterone acetate, and hydroxyprogesterone caproate, the 19-norprogesterone derivative nomegestrol acetate, and the 19-nortestosterone derivatives norethisterone acetate and norethisterone enanthate.

== Progestogen esters ==
Hydroxyprogesterone caproate (Delalutin, Proluton), the first progestogen ester.

Estrogens were discovered in 1929, and beginning in 1936, a variety of estradiol esters, such as estradiol benzoate and estradiol dipropionate, were introduced for clinical use. Testosterone esters, such as testosterone propionate and testosterone phenylacetate, were also introduced around this time. In contrast to estradiol and testosterone, progesterone proved more difficult to esterify. In fact, esterification involves the replacement of a hydroxyl group with an alkoxy group, and unlike estradiol and testosterone, progesterone does not possess any hydroxyl groups, so it is actually not chemically possible to esterify progesterone itself. The first progestogen esters were not introduced until the mid-1950s, and were esters of 17α-hydroxyprogesterone (which, unlike progesterone, has a hydroxyl group available for esterification) rather than of progesterone; they included 17α-hydroxyprogesterone caproate (Delalutin, Proluton) and 17α-hydroxyprogesterone acetate (Prodrox). The following quote of de Médicis Sajous et al. (1961) details the development of progestogen esters:

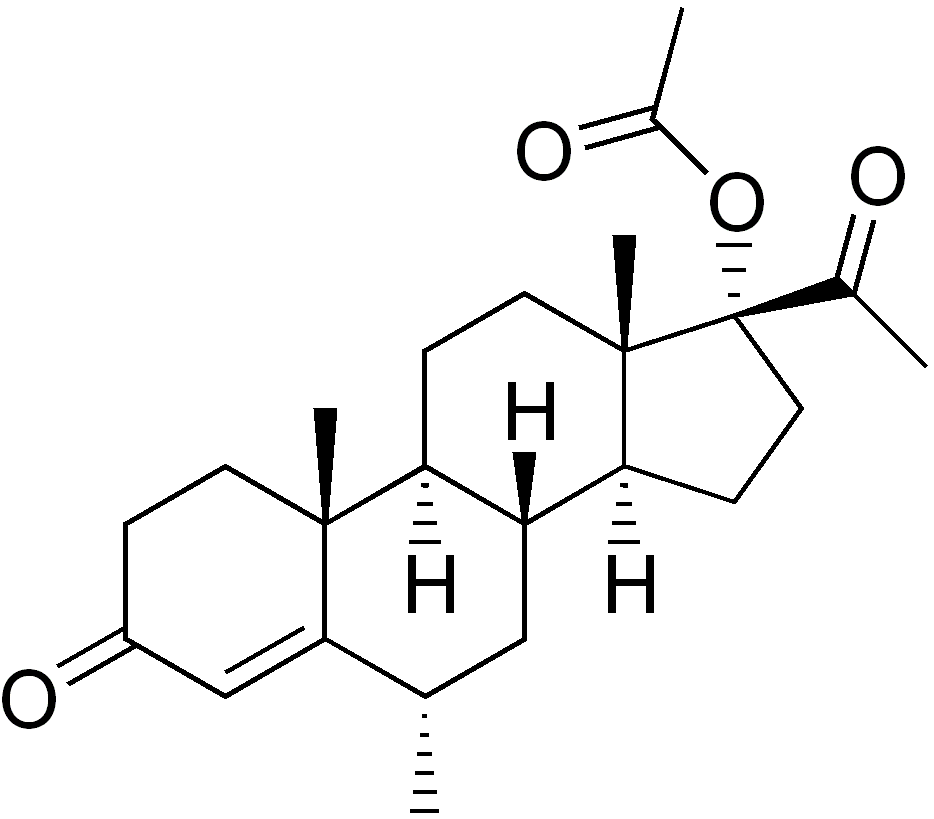
Medroxyprogesterone acetate (Provera), the most popular and widely used progestogen ester.

Over a period of several years, many tens of thousands of dollars were invested by Upjohn in an effort to find an easily absorbed, orally active progesterone ester. The effort met with but limited success. One promising ester, [17α-hydroxyprogesterone acetate], marketed as Prodox, was found. It was more active by mouth than other progesterone preparations then on the market, but it was not so active orally as desired.

To obtain a progestational drug with the wanted properties, it appeared necessary to alter the progesterone molecule itself. Beginning about 1957, Upjohn steroid chemists accordingly prepared a series of progesterones modified in the various ways that had been found to multiply the power of cortisone and hydrocortisone. One of the modifications — worked out by a team under Dr. John C. Babcock — was the attachment of a carbon atom and three hydrogen atoms — a methyl group — to carbon 6 in the first ring of the progesterone steroid nucleus. A similar modification had been the key step in creating Medrol, Upjohn's high-potency, antiinflammatory cortisone-type steroid. The new progestational agent was [6α-methyl-17α-hydroxyprogesterone acetate] or [medroxyprogesterone acetate], which Upjohn has trademarked Provera. It has proved to be the most potent progestational drug yet uncovered — hundreds of times more active orally than progesterone and, weight for weight, some fifty times more active by subcutaneous injection. Provera was placed on the market in 1959.

Medroxyprogesterone acetate (Provera) entered clinical use and became widely marketed, largely superseding the 17α-hydroxyprogesterone esters. A variety of analogues of medroxyprogesterone acetate, such as chlormadinone acetate, cyproterone acetate, and megestrol acetate, were subsequently developed and introduced as well. Progestogen esters of other groups of progestins have also been introduced, including the 19-norprogesterone derivatives gestonorone caproate, segesterone acetate (nestorone), nomegestrol acetate, and norgestomet (11β-methyl-17α-acetoxy-19-norprogesterone) and the 19-nortestosterone derivatives etynodiol diacetate, norethisterone acetate, norethisterone enanthate, and quingestanol acetate.

Although esters of steroidal androgens and estrogens are generally inactive themselves and act as prodrugs, the same is not true for many progestogen esters. For instance, esters of 17α-hydroxyprogesterone derivatives, such as hydroxyprogesterone caproate, medroxyprogesterone acetate, and cyproterone acetate, are highly active themselves (in fact, they are far more active than their unesterified forms) and are not prodrugs, forming little or none of their parent compounds (in the cases of the examples given, hydroxyprogesterone, medroxyprogesterone, and cyproterone, respectively). On the other hand, esters of 19-nortestosterone derivatives, such as etynodiol diacetate, norethisterone acetate, norethisterone enanthate, and quingestanol acetate, are all prodrugs.

== Progestogen ethers ==
Quingestrone (Enol-Luteovis), a progesterone ether marketed in Italy.

Progesterone 3-acetyl enol ether (progesterone acetate), a progest-erone ether that was never marketed.

Although it cannot be esterified, progesterone possesses ketone groups at the C3 and C20 positions, and for this reason, it is possible to etherify it; that is, progesterone ethers are possible. Quingestrone (Enol-Luteovis) is a progesterone ether (specifically, the 3-cyclopentyl ether of progesterone) that has been marketed in Italy as an oral contraceptive. Quingestrone is a variant of progesterone with improved pharmacokinetics, including higher potency, oral activity, greater lipophilicity, and a longer half-life. Two other progestogens, pentagestrone (never marketed) and pentagestrone acetate (Gestovis, Gestovister), are the 3-cyclopentyl enol ethers of 17α-hydroxyprogesterone and 17α-hydroxyprogesterone acetate, respectively, while progesterone 3-acetyl enol ether (never marketed) is the 3-acetyl enol ether of progesterone.

Although it was originally thought that progesterone ethers like quingestrone were prodrugs of progesterone, it was subsequently found that this is not the case and that quingestrone instead seems to be transformed directly into the corresponding alcohols rather than ketones. These alcohols are progesterone metabolites like pregnanolones and pregnanediols, and as some of these metabolites, for instance 3β-dihydroprogesterone, have potent progestogenic activity, this may account for the clinical efficacy of progestogen ethers like quingestrone as progestogens.

== Progestogen oximes ==
P1-185, a progesterone oxime that was never marketed.

While not esters, C3 and C20 oxime conjugates of progesterone, such as progesterone carboxymethyloxime (progesterone 3-(O-carboxymethyl)oxime; P4-3-CMO), P1-185 (progesterone 3-O-(L-valine)-E-oxime), EIDD-1723 (progesterone (20E)-20-[O-[(phosphonooxy)methyl]oxime] sodium salt), EIDD-036 (progesterone 20-oxime), and VOLT-02 (chemical structure unreleased), have been developed as water-soluble progesterone and neurosteroid prodrugs, although none have completed clinical development or been marketed as of yet.

Some 19-nortestosterone progestins, including the marketed progestins norgestimate and norelgestromin and the non-marketed progestin norethisterone acetate oxime, are C3 oximes, although they have potent progestogenic activity of their own and are not necessarily prodrugs of the corresponding ketones.

== See also ==
- List of progestogen esters
- Steroid ester
- Estrogen ester
- Androgen ester
- List of steroid esters
- List of progestogens
