= C20H28O2 =

The molecular formula C_{20}H_{28}O_{2} may refer to:

- Alitretinoin
- Dehydroabietic acid
- 5α-Dihydronorethisterone
- Dimethyldienolone
- Ethyldienolone
- Ethylestradiol
- Etynodiol
- Isotretinoin, a treatment of acne
- Methandrostenolone
- Methoxydienone
- Nordinone
- Norgesterone
- 19-Norprogesterone
- Norvinisterone
- Retinoic acid
- Tetrahydrocannabinol-C4
- Tretinoin
