= 19-Norpregnane =

Names
- IUPAC name 17β-Ethyl-5ξ-estrane
- Systematic IUPAC name (1S,3aS,3bR,5aΞ,9aS,9bR,11aR)-1-Ethyl-11a-methylhexadecahydro-1H-cyclopenta[a]phenanthrene
- Other names 13β-Methyl-17β-ethylgonane

Identifiers
3D model (JSmol)	Interactive image
ChemSpider	58838804
PubChem CID	53649607
CompTox Dashboard (EPA)	DTXSID201336999
- InChI: InChI=1S/C20H34/c1-3-15-9-11-19-18-10-8-14-6-4-5-7-16(14)17(18)12-13-20(15,19)2/h14-19H,3-13H2,1-2H3/t14?,15-,16-,17+,18+,19-,20+/m0/s1 Key: ALSXNTIVNJBNQE-ZWONNITHSA-N
- SMILES: CC[C@H]1CC[C@@H]2[C@@]1(CC[C@H]3[C@H]2CCC4[C@@H]3CCCC4)C

Properties
Chemical formula	C_{20}H_{34}
Molar mass	274.492 g·mol^{−1}
- Except where otherwise noted, data are given for materials in their standard state (at 25 °C [77 °F], 100 kPa). Infobox references

19-Norpregnane, also known as 13β-methyl-17β-ethylgonane, is a norsteroid and the 19-demethyl analogue of pregnane. It is the parent compound of 19-norprogesterone (19-norpregn-4-ene-3,20-dione) and derivatives of it such as the progestins demegestone, gestonorone caproate (gestronol hexanoate), nomegestrol acetate, norgestomet, promegestone, segesterone acetate (nestorone), and trimegestone.

== See also ==
- Gonane
- Androstane
- Estrane
