= Vinyltestosterone =

Chemical compound

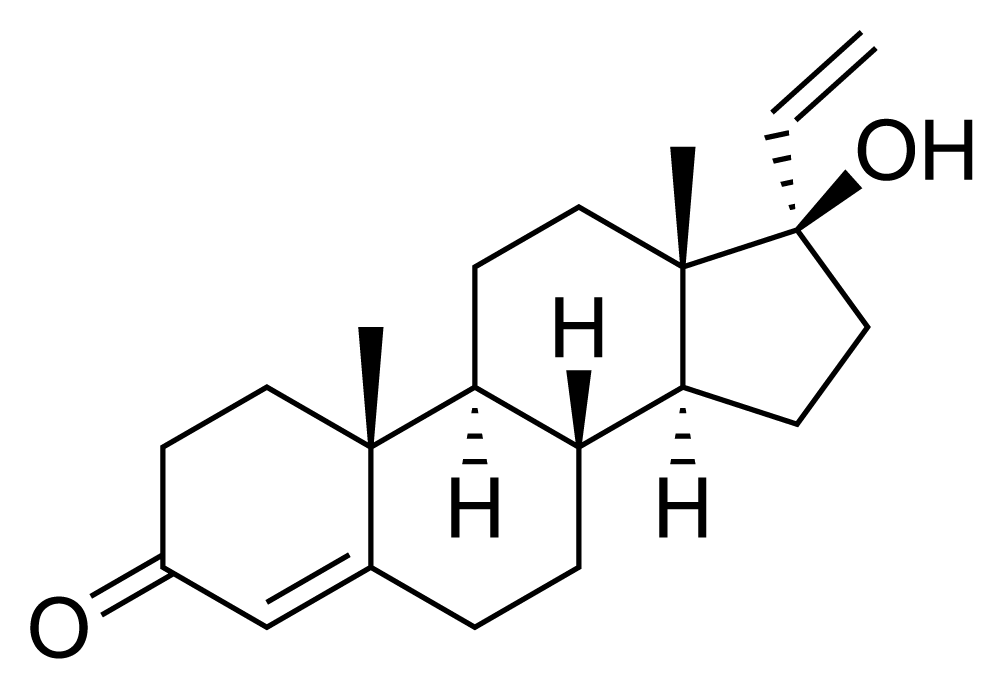

Clinical data
- Other names: 17α-Vinyltestosterone; Ethenyltestosterone; 17α-Ethenyltestosterone; 17α-Vinylandrost-4-en-17β-ol-3-one; 17α-Hydroxypregna-4,20-dien-3-one

Identifiers
- IUPAC name: (8R,9S,10R,13S,14S,17S)-17-Ethenyl-17-hydroxy-10,13-dimethyl-2,6,7,8,9,11,12,14,15,16-decahydro-1H-cyclopenta[a]phenanthren-3-one
- CAS Number: 1235-98-9
- PubChem CID: 222286
- ChemSpider: 192964
- UNII: SGZ6EUF8MU

Chemical and physical data
- Formula: C_{21}H_{30}O_{2}
- Molar mass: 314.469 g·mol^{−1}
- 3D model (JSmol): Interactive image
- SMILES: C[C@]12CCC(=O)C=C1CC[C@@H]3[C@@H]2CC[C@]4([C@H]3CC[C@@]4(C=C)O)C
- InChI: InChI=1S/C21H30O2/c1-4-21(23)12-9-18-16-6-5-14-13-15(22)7-10-19(14,2)17(16)8-11-20(18,21)3/h4,13,16-18,23H,1,5-12H2,2-3H3/t16-,17+,18+,19+,20+,21-/m1/s1; Key:ILGPJZIKYMIGMU-SJFWLOONSA-N

Vinyltestosterone (also known as 17α-vinyltestosterone, 17α-vinylandrost-4-en-17β-ol-3-one, and 17α-hydroxypregna-4,20-dien-3-one) is a synthetic anabolic–androgenic steroid (AAS) that was never marketed. However, two 19-nortestosterone derivatives of vinyltestosterone, norvinisterone (17α-vinyl-19-nortestosterone) and norgesterone (17α-vinyl-δ^{5(10)}-19-nortestosterone), have been marketed. They are used as progestins for female hormonal contraception, rather than as AAS.

Vinyltestosterone is a relatively weak AAS. In one study, it showed approximately one-third and one-fifth of the respective androgenic and anabolic activity of other AAS such as nandrolone (19-nortestosterone), methyltestosterone (17α-methyltestosterone), and ethyltestosterone (17α-ethyltestosterone) in castrated male rats, whereas ethisterone (17α-ethynyltestosterone) showed almost no androgenic and anabolic activity (only 1/20 the anabolic potency of vinyltestosterone). Additionally, in women with metastatic breast cancer, vinyltestosterone was found to be ineffective in treating the disease (unlike other AAS such as testosterone propionate or fluoxymesterone) and produced little or no virilization in the women at a dosage of 100 mg intramuscularly three times per week.

== See also ==
- Allyltestosterone
