= Gestronol =

Chemical compound

Clinical data
- Other names: Gestonorone; 17α-Hydroxy-19-norprogesterone; 17α-Hydroxy-19-norpregn-4-ene-3,20-dione

Identifiers
- IUPAC name: (8R,9S,10R,13S,14S,17R)-17-Acetyl-17-hydroxy-13-methyl-1,2,6,7,8,9,10,11,12,14,15,16-dodecahydrocyclopenta[a]phenanthren-3-one
- CAS Number: 2137-18-0
- PubChem CID: 102210
- ChemSpider: 4386807
- UNII: H4G605B7VP
- CompTox Dashboard (EPA): DTXSID50175631
- ECHA InfoCard: 100.016.708

Chemical and physical data
- Formula: C_{20}H_{28}O_{3}
- Molar mass: 316.441 g·mol^{−1}
- 3D model (JSmol): Interactive image
- SMILES: CC(=O)[C@]1(CC[C@@H]2[C@@]1(CC[C@H]3[C@H]2CCC4=CC(=O)CC[C@H]34)C)O
- InChI: InChI=1S/C20H28O3/c1-12(21)20(23)10-8-18-17-5-3-13-11-14(22)4-6-15(13)16(17)7-9-19(18,20)2/h11,15-18,23H,3-10H2,1-2H3/t15-,16+,17+,18-,19-,20-/m0/s1; Key:GTFUITFQDGVJSK-XGXHKTLJSA-N

Gestronol (BAN), also known as gestonorone, as well as 17α-hydroxy-19-norprogesterone or 17α-hydroxy-19-norpregn-4-ene-3,20-dione, is a progestin of the 19-norprogesterone and 17α-hydroxyprogesterone groups which was never marketed. The C17α caproate ester of gestronol, gestonorone caproate (gestronol hexanoate), in contrast, has been marketed.

Gestronol shows relatively low affinity for the progesterone receptor, only about 12.5% of that of progesterone and about 2.5% of that of 19-norprogesterone in one assay. On the other hand, gestronol had far higher affinity than 17α-hydroxyprogesterone, which showed less than 0.1% of the affinity of progesterone for the progesterone receptor.

== See also ==
- 17α-Methyl-19-norprogesterone
