= 17α-Methyl-19-norprogesterone =

Chemical compound

Clinical data
- Other names: H-3510; 17α-Methyl-19-norpregn-4-ene-3,20-dione; (17β)-17-Acetyl-17-methylestr-4-en-3-one
- Drug class: Progestin; Progestogen

Identifiers
- CAS Number: 851-11-6
- PubChem CID: 165360253
- ChemSpider: 34253447
- CompTox Dashboard (EPA): DTXSID501337415

Chemical and physical data
- Formula: C_{21}H_{30}O_{2}
- Molar mass: 314.469 g·mol^{−1}
- 3D model (JSmol): Interactive image
- SMILES: O=C(C)[C@](C)1CC[C@]([H])2[C@@]([H])3CCC4=CC(CCC4C3CC[C@@]21C)=O
- InChI: InChI=1S/C21H30O2/c1-13(22)20(2)11-9-19-18-6-4-14-12-15(23)5-7-16(14)17(18)8-10-21(19,20)3/h12,16-19H,4-11H2,1-3H3/t16-,17+,18+,19-,20+,21-/m0/s1; Key:SMHQTBXJLXZKNT-VXAANUECSA-N

17α-Methyl-19-norprogesterone (developmental code name H-3510), also known as 17α-methyl-19-norpregn-4-ene-3,20-dione, is a progestin which was never marketed. It is a derivative of progesterone, and is the combined derivative of 17α-methylprogesterone and 19-norprogesterone. The drug is the parent compound of a subgroup of the 19-norprogesterone group of progestins, which includes demegestone (the δ^{9} derivative), promegestone (the δ^{9} and 21-methyl derivative), and trimegestone (the δ^{9}, 21-methyl, and 21-hydroxyl derivative).

== See also ==
- Gestronol (17α-hydroxy-19-norprogesterone)
