= Retroprogesterone =

Chemical compound

Clinical data
- Other names: 9β,10α-Progesterone; 9β,10α-Pregn-4-ene-3,20-dione
- Drug class: Progestin; Progestogen
- ATC code: None

Identifiers
- IUPAC name: (8S,9R,10S,13S,14S,17S)-17-acetyl-10,13-dimethyl-1,2,6,7,8,9,11,12,14,15,16,17-dodecahydrocyclopenta[a]phenanthren-3-one
- CAS Number: 2755-10-4
- PubChem CID: 92940
- ChemSpider: 83898
- UNII: R94ZS616JR
- CompTox Dashboard (EPA): DTXSID101335986
- ECHA InfoCard: 100.018.553

Chemical and physical data
- Formula: C_{21}H_{30}O_{2}
- Molar mass: 314.469 g·mol^{−1}
- 3D model (JSmol): Interactive image
- SMILES: CC(=O)C1CCC2C1(CCC3C2CCC4=CC(=O)CCC34C)C
- InChI: InChI=RJKFOVLPORLFTN-HQZYFCCVSA-N; Key:1S/C21H30O2/c1-13(22)17-6-7-18-16-5-4-14-12-15(23)8-10-20(14,2)19(16)9-11-21(17,18)3/h12,16-19H,4-11H2,1-3H3/t16-,17+,18-,19+,20+,21+/m0/s1

Retroprogesterone, also known as 9β,10α-progesterone or as 9β,10α-pregn-4-ene-3,20-dione, is a progestin which was never marketed. It is a stereoisomer of the naturally occurring progestogen progesterone, in which the hydrogen atom at the 9th carbon is in the α-position (below the plane) instead of the β-position (above the plane) and the methyl group at the 10th carbon is in the β-position instead of the α-position. In other words, the atom positions at the two carbons have been reversed relative to progesterone, hence the name retroprogesterone. This reversal results in a "bent" configuration in which the plane of rings A and B is orientated at a 60° angle below the rings C and D. This configuration is ideal for interaction with the progesterone receptor, with retroprogesterone binding with high affinity to this receptor. However, the configuration is not as ideal for binding to other steroid hormone receptors, and as a result, retroprogesterone derivatives have increased selectivity for the progesterone receptor relative to progesterone.

Retroprogesterone is the parent compound of a group of progestins consisting of the marketed progestins dydrogesterone (6-dehydroretroprogesterone) and trengestone (1,6-didehydro-6-chlororetroprogesterone) and the never-marketed progestin Ro 6-3129, as well as the active metabolites of these progestins like 20α-dihydrodydrogesterone and 20α-dihydrotrengestone (i.e., the 20α-hydroxylated analogues).

== See also ==
- 17α-Hydroxyprogesterone
- 19-Norprogesterone
- 17α-Ethynyltestosterone
- 19-Nortestosterone
- 17α-Spirolactone
