= Proligestone =

Chemical compound

Clinical data
- Trade names: Covinan, Delvosteron
- Other names: 14α,17α-Propylidenedioxyprogesterone; 14α,17α-Dihydroxyprogesterone cyclic acetal with propionaldehyde; 14α,17α-Dihydroxypregn-4-ene-3,20-dione cyclic acetal with propionaldehyde
- Drug class: Progestogen; Progestin
- ATC code: G03DA90 (WHO)

Identifiers
- IUPAC name: 14α,17α-(propylidenebis(oxy))pregn-4-ene-3,20-dione
- CAS Number: 23873-85-0
- PubChem CID: 71906
- ChemSpider: 64917
- UNII: 55772LJ01V
- KEGG: D08429
- ChEMBL: ChEMBL2106696
- CompTox Dashboard (EPA): DTXSID501016687
- ECHA InfoCard: 100.041.733

Chemical and physical data
- Formula: C_{24}H_{34}O_{4}
- Molar mass: 386.532 g·mol^{−1}
- 3D model (JSmol): Interactive image
- SMILES: CCC1O[C@@]23CC[C@]([C@]2(CC[C@H]4[C@H]3CCC5=CC(=O)CC[C@]45C)C)(O1)C(=O)C
- InChI: InChI=1S/C24H34O4/c1-5-20-27-23(15(2)25)12-13-24(28-20)19-7-6-16-14-17(26)8-10-21(16,3)18(19)9-11-22(23,24)4/h14,18-20H,5-13H2,1-4H3/t18-,19+,20?,21-,22+,23-,24+/m0/s1; Key:MQSDUYIXZDSLSZ-QSDCUGRSSA-N

Proligestone, sold under the brand names Covinan and Delvosteron, is a progestin medication which is used in veterinary medicine.

== Uses ==
=== Veterinary ===
Proligestone is used to control estrus in dogs and cats and has also been used to treat hypersexuality in dogs and cats.

== Pharmacology ==
=== Pharmacodynamics ===
Proligestone is a progestogen, or an agonist of the progesterone receptor (PR).

== Chemistry ==
Proligestone, also known as 14α,17α-propylidenedioxyprogesterone or as 14α,17α-dihydroxyprogesterone cyclic acetal with propionaldehyde, as well as 14α,17α-propylidenedioxypregn-4-ene-3,20-dione, is a synthetic pregnane steroid and a derivative of progesterone and 17α-hydroxyprogesterone. It is a C14α,17α cyclic ketal of 14α,17α-dihydroxyprogesterone.

== History ==
Proligestone was described as early as 1968 and was introduced for veterinary use in 1975.

== Society and culture ==
=== Generic names ===
Proligestone is the generic name of the drug and its INN and BAN.

=== Brand names ===
Proligestone is marketed under the brand names Covinan and Delvosteron.

=== Availability ===
Proligestone is or has been available for veterinary use in Argentina, Australia, Austria, Belgium, Czechoslovakia, France, Germany, Ireland, Italy, the Netherlands, New Zealand, Poland, South Africa, Switzerland, and the United Kingdom.
