= Norvinisterone =

Chemical compound

Clinical data
- Trade names: Neoprogestin, Nor-Progestelea
- Other names: Vinylnortestosterone; SC-4641; 17α-Vinyl-19-nortestosterone; 17α-Vinylestr-4-en-17β-ol-3-one
- Routes of administration: By mouth
- Drug class: Progestogen; Progestin; Androgen; Anabolic steroid
- ATC code: None

Identifiers
- IUPAC name: (8R,9S,10R,13S,14S,17R)-17-ethenyl-17-hydroxy-13-methyl-1,2,6,7,8,9,10,11,12,14,15,16-dodecahydrocyclopenta[a]phenanthren-3-one
- CAS Number: 6795-60-4
- PubChem CID: 65588
- ChemSpider: 59030
- UNII: 7Q843V12Q0
- CompTox Dashboard (EPA): DTXSID501016506

Chemical and physical data
- Formula: C_{20}H_{28}O_{2}
- Molar mass: 300.442 g·mol^{−1}
- 3D model (JSmol): Interactive image
- Melting point: 169 to 171 °C (336 to 340 °F)
- SMILES: O=C4\C=C2/[C@@H]([C@H]1CC[C@@]3([C@](O)(\C=C)CC[C@H]3[C@@H]1CC2)C)CC4
- InChI: InChI=1S/C20H28O2/c1-3-20(22)11-9-18-17-6-4-13-12-14(21)5-7-15(13)16(17)8-10-19(18,20)2/h3,12,15-18,22H,1,4-11H2,2H3/t15-,16+,17+,18-,19-,20-/m0/s1; Key:VOJYZDFYEHKHAP-XGXHKTLJSA-N

Norvinisterone, sold under the brand names Neoprogestin and Nor-Progestelea, is a progestin and androgen/anabolic steroid (AAS) medication which was used in Europe but is now no longer marketed. It is taken by mouth.

Norvinisterone is a progestin, or a synthetic progestogen, and hence is an agonist of the progesterone receptor, the biological target of progestogens like progesterone. It has androgenic activity.

Norvinisterone was synthesized in 1953. It is no longer available.

== Medical uses ==
Norvinisterone was used in hormonal contraception to prevent pregnancy.

== Pharmacology ==
=== Pharmacodynamics ===
Norvinisterone is a progestogen. It appears to be quite androgenic, with about one-third and one-fifth of the androgenic and anabolic activity, respectively, of nandrolone in animal bioassays. However, it has also been reported to have little anabolic activity.

== Chemistry ==
Norvinisterone, also known as 17α-vinyl-19-nortestosterone or as 17α-vinylestr-4-en-17β-ol-3-one, is a synthetic estrane steroid and a derivative of testosterone and 19-nortestosterone. Analogues of norvinisterone include the progestin norgesterone and the AAS vinyltestosterone.

== History ==
Norvinisterone was synthesized in 1953 and was studied in humans by 1960.

== Society and culture ==
=== Generic names ===
Norvinisterone is the generic name of the drug and its INN. It is also known as vinylnortestosterone and is known by its developmental code name SC-4641.

=== Brand names ===
Norvinisterone was marketed under the brand names Neoprogestin and Nor-Progestelea by Syntex.

=== Availability ===
Norgesterone is no longer marketed and hence is no longer available in any country.
