= Demegestone =

Chemical compound

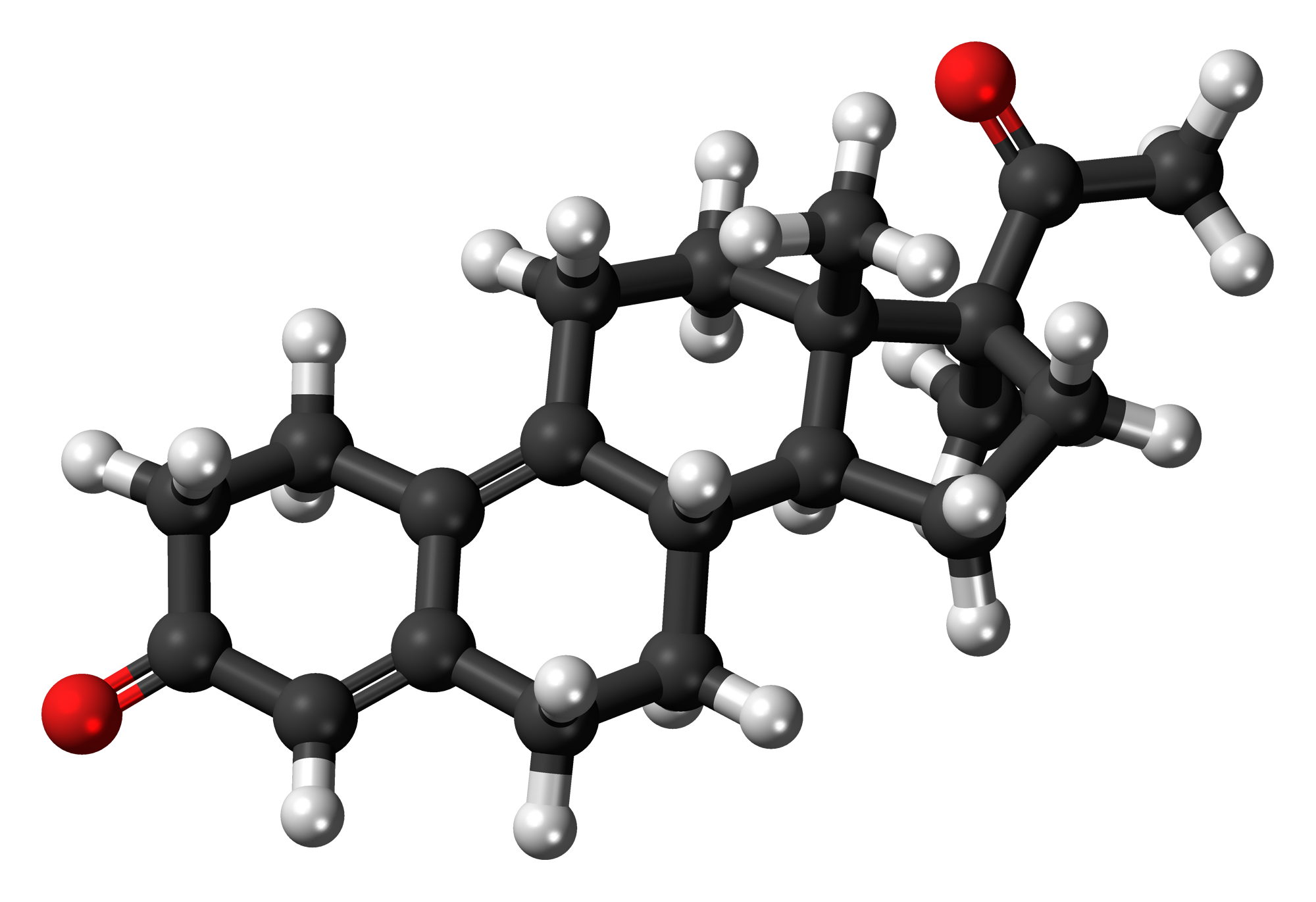

Clinical data
- Trade names: Lutionex
- Other names: Dimegestone; R-2453; RU-2453; 17α-Methyl-δ^{9}-19-norprogesterone; 17α-Methyl-19-norpregna-4,9-diene-3,20-dione
- Routes of administration: By mouth
- Drug class: Progestogen; Progestin
- ATC code: G03DB05 (WHO)

Pharmacokinetic data
- Bioavailability: Good
- Metabolism: Hydroxylation, others
- Metabolites: • 21-Hydroxydemegestone • Others
- Excretion: Urine

Identifiers
- IUPAC name: (8S,13S,14S,17S)-17-acetyl-13,17-dimethyl-1,2,6,7,8,11,12,14,15,16-decahydrocyclopenta[a]phenanthren-3-one
- CAS Number: 10116-22-0
- PubChem CID: 93057
- ChemSpider: 84009
- UNII: 6E89AM91SZ
- KEGG: D07223
- ChEBI: CHEBI:135339
- ChEMBL: ChEMBL2104231
- CompTox Dashboard (EPA): DTXSID20878581
- ECHA InfoCard: 100.030.278

Chemical and physical data
- Formula: C_{21}H_{28}O_{2}
- Molar mass: 312.453 g·mol^{−1}
- 3D model (JSmol): Interactive image
- SMILES: CC(=O)[C@]1(CC[C@@H]2[C@@]1(CCC3=C4CCC(=O)C=C4CC[C@@H]23)C)C
- InChI: InChI=1S/C21H28O2/c1-13(22)20(2)11-9-19-18-6-4-14-12-15(23)5-7-16(14)17(18)8-10-21(19,20)3/h12,18-19H,4-11H2,1-3H3/t18-,19+,20-,21+/m1/s1; Key:JWAHBTQSSMYISL-MHTWAQMVSA-N

Demegestone, sold under the brand name Lutionex, is a progestin medication which was previously used to treat luteal insufficiency but is now no longer marketed. It is taken by mouth.

Demegestone is a progestin, or a synthetic progestogen, and hence is an agonist of the progesterone receptor, the biological target of progestogens like progesterone. It has no androgenic activity.

Demegestone was first described in 1966 and was introduced for medical use in France in 1974. It has only been marketed in France, and has since been discontinued in this country.

== Medical uses ==
Demegestone has been used to treat luteal insufficiency. It has also been studied in combination with estrogens, such as moxestrol, as an oral contraceptive and treatment for infertility.

== Pharmacology ==
=== Pharmacodynamics ===
Demegestone is a progestogen, and hence is an agonist of the progesterone receptor (PR). It is a highly potent progestogen, showing 50 times the potency of progesterone in the Clauberg test. The ovulation-inbhiting dosage of demegestone is 2.5 mg/day, while the endometrial transformation dosage is 100 mg per cycle. The medication is devoid of androgenic activity, and instead has some antiandrogenic activity. Demegestone has low affinity for the glucocorticoid receptor. In a particular bioassay, both demegestone and progesterone showed antiglucocorticoid rather than glucocorticoid activity. The major metabolite of demegestone, a 21-hydroxylated metabolite, is a moderately potent progestogen (4 times the potency of progesterone) and a weak mineralocorticoid (2% of the potency of deoxycorticosterone).

Relative affinities (%) of demegestone
Compound	PR	AR	ER	GR	MR	SHBG	CBG
Demegestone	230	1	0	5	1–2	?	?
Notes: Values are percentages (%). Reference ligands (100%) were progesterone for the PR, testosterone for the AR, E2 for the ER, DEXA for the GR, aldosterone for the MR, DHT for SHBG, and cortisol for CBG. Sources:

=== Pharmacokinetics ===
Demegestone has good bioavailability. The initial volume of distribution of demegestone is 31 L. Demegestone is metabolized by hydroxylation at the C21, C1, C2, and C11 positions, which is eventually followed by A-ring aromatization after 1,2-dehydration. The major metabolite of demegestone is a 21-hydroxy derivative. The metabolic clearance rate of demegestone is 20 L/h. Its biological half-lives are 2.39 and 0.24 hours with intravenous injection. Demegestone and/or its metabolites are excreted, at least in part, in urine.

== Chemistry ==
Demegestone, also known as 17α-methyl-δ^{9}-19-norprogesterone or as 17α-methyl-19-norpregna-4,9-diene-3,20-dione, is a synthetic norpregnane steroid and a derivative of progesterone. It is specifically a combined derivative of 17α-methylprogesterone and 19-norprogesterone, or of 17α-methyl-19-norprogesterone. Related derivatives of 17α-methyl-19-norprogesterone include promegestone and trimegestone.

== History ==
Demegestone was first described in the literature in 1964 and was introduced for medical use in 1974 in France. It was developed by Roussel Uclaf.

== Society and culture ==
=== Generic names ===
Demegestone is the generic name of the drug and its INN. It is also known by its developmental code name R-2453 or RU-2453.

=== Brand names ===
Demegestone was marketed under the brand name Lutionex.

=== Availability ===
Demegestone is no longer marketed and hence is no longer available in any country. It was previously available in France.
