= Ro 6-3129 =

Chemical compound

Clinical data
- Other names: 16α-Ethylthiodydrogesterone; 16α-Ethylthio-6-dehydroretroprogesterone; 16α-Ethylthio-9β,10α-pregna-4,6-diene-3,20-dione
- Routes of administration: Oral

Identifiers
- IUPAC name: (1R,2S,10S,11S,13R,14S,15S)-14-Acetyl-13-(ethylsulfanyl)-2,15-dimethyltetracyclo[8.7.0.0^{2,7}.0^{11,15}]heptadeca-6,8-dien-5-one
- CAS Number: 39729-35-6
- ChemSpider: 59650717

Chemical and physical data
- Formula: C_{23}H_{32}O_{2}S
- Molar mass: 372.57 g·mol^{−1}
- 3D model (JSmol): Interactive image
- SMILES: CCS[C@@H]1C[C@H]2[C@@H]3C=CC4=CC(=O)CC[C@@]4(C)[C@@H]3CC[C@]2(C)[C@H]1C(C)=O
- InChI: InChI=1S/C23H32O2S/c1-5-26-20-13-19-17-7-6-15-12-16(25)8-10-22(15,3)18(17)9-11-23(19,4)21(20)14(2)24/h6-7,12,17-21H,5,8-11,13H2,1-4H3/t17-,18-,19+,20-,21+,22-,23?/m1/s1; Key:OWNPEOXTHUGQDI-LWAHLCLDSA-N

Ro 6-3129, also known as 16α-ethylthio-6-dehydroretroprogesterone or as 16α-ethylthio-9β,10α-pregna-4,6-diene-3,20-dione, as well as 16α-ethylthiodydrogesterone, is a progestogen of the retroprogesterone group which was developed by Roche but was never marketed. It shows greater potency than dydrogesterone in bioassays.
