= 18-Methyltestosterone =

Chemical compound

Clinical data
- Other names: 18-MT; 18-Methylandrost-4-en-17β-ol-3-one; 13β-Ethyl-17β-hydroxy-18-norandrost-4-en-3-one
- Drug class: Androgen; Anabolic steroid

Identifiers
- IUPAC name: (8R,9S,10R,13S,14S,17S)-13-ethyl-17-hydroxy-10-methyl-1,2,6,7,8,9,11,12,14,15,16,17-dodecahydrocyclopenta[a]phenanthren-3-one
- CAS Number: 7381-64-8
- PubChem CID: 54393203
- ChemSpider: 114811238
- UNII: 8MFH3FAP6D
- CompTox Dashboard (EPA): DTXSID301337407

Chemical and physical data
- Formula: C_{20}H_{30}O_{2}
- Molar mass: 302.458 g·mol^{−1}
- 3D model (JSmol): Interactive image
- SMILES: CC[C@]12CC[C@H]3[C@H]([C@@H]1CC[C@@H]2O)CCC4=CC(=O)CC[C@]34C
- InChI: InChI=1S/C20H30O2/c1-3-20-11-9-16-15(17(20)6-7-18(20)22)5-4-13-12-14(21)8-10-19(13,16)2/h12,15-18,22H,3-11H2,1-2H3/t15-,16+,17+,18+,19+,20+/m1/s1; Key:VIDBKWVIQCRYHG-HLXURNFRSA-N

18-Methyltestosterone (18-MT) is an androgen/anabolic steroid (AAS) which was never marketed. Along with 19-nortestosterone (nandrolone) and 17α-ethynyltestosterone (ethisterone), it is a parent structure of a number of progestogens and AAS. These include the progestogens levonorgestrel (17α-ethynyl-18-methyl-19-nortestosterone) and its derivatives (e.g., desogestrel, gestodene, norgestimate, gestrinone) as well as AAS such as norboletone (17α-ethyl-18-methyl-19-nortestosterone) and tetrahydrogestrinone (THG; δ^{9,11}-17α-ethyl-18-methyl-19-nortestosterone).

== See also ==
- List of androgens/anabolic steroids
