= Dimethisterone =

Chemical compound

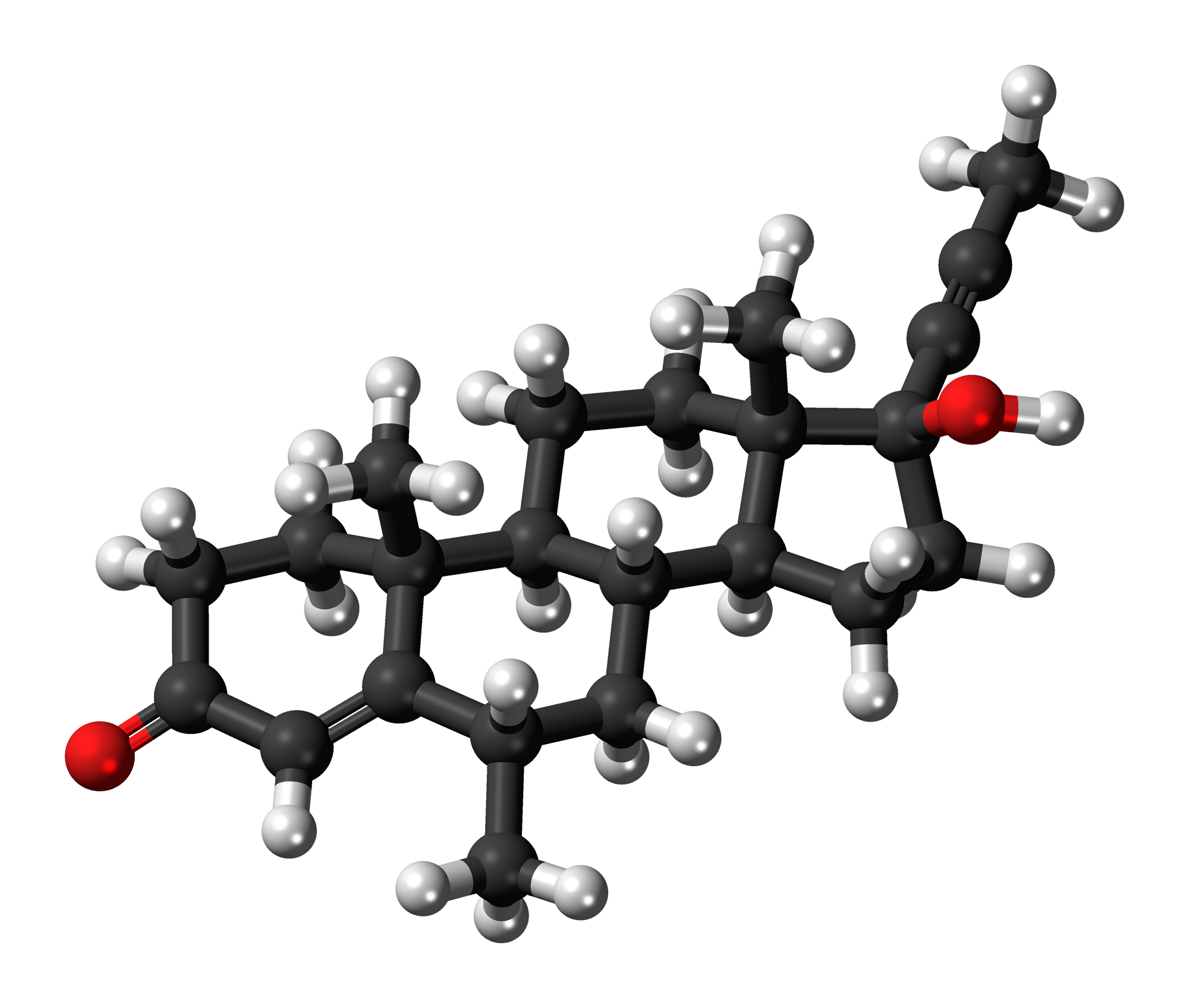

Clinical data
- Trade names: Lutagan, Secrosteron, others
- Other names: Dimethindrone; 6α,21-Dimethylethisterone; 6α,21-Dimethyl-17α-ethynyltestosterone; 17α-Ethynyl-6α,21-dimethylandrost-4-en-17β-ol-3-one; 6α,21-Dimethyl-17β-hydroxy-17α-pregn-4-en-20-yn-3-one
- Routes of administration: By mouth
- Drug class: Progestogen; Progestin

Identifiers
- IUPAC name: (6S,8R,9S,10R,13S,14S,17S)-17-hydroxy-6,10,13-trimethyl-17-prop-1-ynyl-2,6,7,8,9,11,12,14,15,16-decahydro-1H-cyclopenta[a]phenanthren-3-one
- CAS Number: 79-64-1
- PubChem CID: 6607
- ChemSpider: 6357
- UNII: OIC9M646C5
- CompTox Dashboard (EPA): DTXSID5057834
- ECHA InfoCard: 100.001.106

Chemical and physical data
- Formula: C_{23}H_{32}O_{2}
- Molar mass: 340.507 g·mol^{−1}
- 3D model (JSmol): Interactive image
- SMILES: CC#C[C@@]1(CC[C@@H]2[C@@]1(CC[C@H]3[C@H]2C[C@@H](C4=CC(=O)CC[C@]34C)C)C)O
- InChI: InChI=1S/C23H32O2/c1-5-9-23(25)12-8-19-17-13-15(2)20-14-16(24)6-10-21(20,3)18(17)7-11-22(19,23)4/h14-15,17-19,25H,6-8,10-13H2,1-4H3/t15-,17+,18-,19-,21+,22-,23-/m0/s1; Key:LVHOURKCKUYIGK-RGUJTQARSA-N

Dimethisterone, formerly sold under the brand names Lutagan and Secrosteron among others, is a progestin medication which was used in birth control pills and in the treatment of gynecological disorders but is now no longer available. It was used both alone and in combination with an estrogen. It is taken by mouth.

Side effects of dimethisterone are similar to those of other progestins. When used in combination with high doses of an estrogen, an increased risk of endometrial cancer can occur. Dimethisterone is a progestin, or a synthetic progestogen, and hence is an agonist of the progesterone receptor, the biological target of progestogens like progesterone. It has some antimineralocorticoid activity and no other important hormonal activity.

Dimethisterone was first described and was introduced for medical use in 1959. It started being used in birth control pills in 1965. However, due to its low potency and consequent inability to prevent the increased risk of endometrial cancer with estrogens, dimethisterone was soon discontinued for such purposes.

== Medical uses ==
Dimethisterone was used alone in the treatment of gynecological disorders and in combination with ethinylestradiol in birth control pills.

== Side effects ==
Side effects of dimethisterone are similar to those of other progestins.

== Pharmacology ==
=== Pharmacodynamics ===
Dimethisterone was derived from modification of ethisterone via introduction of methyl groups at the C6α and C21 positions. Relative to ethisterone, it is 12 times as potent orally as a progestogen in animals (Clauberg test), and, unlike ethisterone, is a pure progestogen with no androgenic (or estrogenic) activity in animals even at very high doses (although some weak antimineralocorticoid activity was observed at high doses in animals). However, in spite of its improved potency over ethisterone, it is a weak progestogen relative to most other progestins, in fact one of the weakest known.

== Chemistry ==
Dimethisterone, also known as 6α,21-dimethylethisterone or as 6α,21-dimethyl-17α-ethynyltestosterone, as well as 17α-ethynyl-6α,21-dimethylandrost-4-en-17β-ol-3-one or as 6α,21-dimethyl-17β-hydroxy-17α-pregn-4-en-20-yn-3-one, is a synthetic androstane steroid and a derivative of testosterone.

=== Synthesis ===
Chemical syntheses of dimethisterone have been published.

== History ==
Dimethisterone was developed by the British pharmaceutical company British Drug Houses (which subsequently merged with Merck KGaA) and was first reported in the medical literature in 1959, with introduction for medical use under the brand name Secrosteron following in the same year. It was introduced in the United States as an oral contraceptive in combination with high doses of ethinylestradiol under the brand name Oracon (25 mg dimethisterone, 100 μg ethinylestradiol) in 1965. Due to the fact that it contains a weak progestogen in combination with a large dose of a potent estrogen, this preparation was eventually found to be associated with a substantially increased risk of endometrial cancer in women, and is now no longer marketed.

The improved potency of dimethisterone due to 6α-methylation reportedly served as the basis for the synthesis of medroxyprogesterone acetate. Whereas hydroxyprogesterone acetate (the 6α-demethylated analogue of medroxyprogesterone acetate) is around twice as potent as ethisterone orally, medroxyprogesterone acetate shows 10 to 25 times the potency of ethisterone.

== Society and culture ==
=== Generic names ===
Dimethisterone is the generic name of the drug and its INN, USAN, and BAN.

=== Brand names ===
Dimethisterone was marketed alone under the brand names Lutagan and Secrosteron and in combination with ethinylestradiol under the brand names Oracon, Ovin, Secrodyl, Secrovin, and Tova.
