= Norgesterone =

Chemical compound

Clinical data
- Trade names: Vestalin (with EE)
- Other names: Norvinodrel; Vinylestrenolone; Vinilestrenolone; Vinylnoretynodrel; 17α-Vinylestr-5(10)-en-17-ol-3-one; 17α-Vinyl-δ^{5(10)}-19-nortestosterone
- Routes of administration: By mouth
- Drug class: Progestogen; Progestin
- ATC code: None

Identifiers
- IUPAC name: (8R,9S,13S,14S,17R)-17-ethenyl-17-hydroxy-13-methyl-1,2,4,6,7,8,9,11,12,14,15,16-dodecahydrocyclopenta[a]phenanthren-3-one
- CAS Number: 13563-60-5
- PubChem CID: 65606
- ChemSpider: 59047
- UNII: YFS274763Y
- CompTox Dashboard (EPA): DTXSID60159482

Chemical and physical data
- Formula: C_{20}H_{28}O_{2}
- Molar mass: 300.442 g·mol^{−1}
- 3D model (JSmol): Interactive image
- SMILES: CC12CCC3C(C1CCC2(C=C)O)CCC4=C3CCC(=O)C4
- InChI: InChI=1S/C20H28O2/c1-3-20(22)11-9-18-17-6-4-13-12-14(21)5-7-15(13)16(17)8-10-19(18,20)2/h3,16-18,22H,1,4-12H2,2H3/t16-,17-,18+,19+,20+/m1/s1; Key:YPVUHOBTCWJYNQ-SLHNCBLASA-N

Norgesterone, also known as norvinodrel or vinylestrenolone and sold under the brand name Vestalin, is a progestin medication which was formerly used in birth control pills for women but is now no longer marketed. It was used in combination with the estrogen ethinylestradiol. It is taken by mouth.

Norgesterone is a progestin, or a synthetic progestogen, and hence is an agonist of the progesterone receptor, the biological target of progestogens like progesterone. It has no androgenic activity.

Norgesterone was first described in 1962. It is no longer available.

== Medical uses ==
Norgesterone was used in combination with ethinylestradiol in birth control pills to prevent pregnancy. It is no longer available.

== Pharmacology ==
=== Pharmacodynamics ===
Norgesterone is a progestogen, and hence is an agonist of the progesterone receptor. Unlike related progestins, it is virtually devoid of androgenic activity in animal assays.

== Chemistry ==
Norgesterone, also known as 17α-vinyl-δ^{5(10)}-19-nortestosterone or as 17α-vinylestr-5(10)-en-17β-ol-3-one, is a synthetic estrane steroid and a derivative of testosterone and 19-nortestosterone. Analogues of norgesterone include norvinisterone (17α-vinyl-19-nortestosterone) and vinyltestosterone (17α-vinyltestosterone).

=== Synthesis ===
The chemical synthesis has been described:

The birch reduction of mestranol (1) gives 17a-vinyl-1,4-Dihydroestradiol 3-methyl ether (2). Quenching in oxalic acid (a weak acid) hydrolyzes the enol-ether, completing the synthesis of norgesterone (3). {Hydrolyzing under more vigorous conditions would result in conjugation of the olefinic bond to the enone position as occurred under the synthesis of nandrolone.}

== History ==
Norgesterone was first described in 1962.

== Society and culture ==
=== Generic names ===
Norgesterone is the generic name of the drug and its INN. It has also been referred to as norvinodrel, vinylestrenolone, and vinylnoretynodrel.

=== Brand names ===
Norgesterone was marketed in combination with ethinylestradiol, an estrogen, as a birth control pill under the brand name Vestalin.

=== Availability ===
Norgesterone is no longer marketed and hence is no longer available in any country.
