= Progestogen-only contraception =

Background
- Type: Hormonal
- First use: ?

Pregnancy rates (first year)
- Perfect use: ?
- Typical use: ?

Usage
- Reversibility: Yes
- User reminders: ?

Advantages and disadvantages
- STI protection: No

Progestogen-only contraception (or progestin-only contraception) relies on progestogens alone to achieve contraception. It is one of the two major types of hormonal contraception, with the other major type being combined hormonal contraceptive methods (including both estrogen and a progestogen). There are several progestogen only contraceptive methods:

- Progestogen-only pills ("mini-pills") (e.g., desogestrel, norethisterone)
- Progestogen-only emergency pills ("day-after pills") (e.g., levonorgestrel)
- Progestogen-only implants (e.g., etonogestrel implant, levonorgestrel implant)
- Progestogen-only injectables (e.g., medroxyprogesterone acetate, norethisterone enanthate)
- Progestogen-only intrauterine devices (e.g., levonorgestrel, progesterone)

== See also ==
- Combined hormonal contraception
