= Progestogen (medication) =

Medication producing effects similar to progesterone

- Drug class
- Progesterone, the natural progestogen in the body and one of the most widely used progestogen medications

Class identifiers
- Synonyms: Progestagen, gestagen, gestogen; progestin (synthetic progestogen); progesterone receptor agonist
- Use: Hormonal birth control, hormone therapy, gynecological disorders, fertility medicine and pregnancy support, sex-hormone suppression, others
- ATC code: G03
- Biological target: Progesterone receptors (PR-A, PR-B, PR-C); membrane progesterone receptors (mPRα, mPRβ, mPRγ, mPRδ, mPRε); progesterone receptor membrane components (PGRMC1, PGRMC2)
- Chemical class: Steroids (pregnanes, norpregnanes, retropregnanes, androstanes, estranes)

Clinical data
- Drugs.com: Drug Classes

External links
- MeSH: D011372

Legal status

A progestogen, also referred to as a progestagen, gestagen, or gestogen, is a type of medication which produces effects similar to those of the biological female sex hormone progesterone in the body. A progestin is a synthetic progestogen. Progestogens are used most commonly in hormonal birth control and menopausal hormone therapy. They can also be used in the treatment of gynecological conditions, to support fertility and pregnancy, to lower sex hormone levels for various purposes, and for other indications. Progestogens are used alone or in combination with estrogens. They are available in a wide variety of formulations and for use by many different routes of administration. Examples of progestogens include natural or bioidentical progesterone as well as progestins such as medroxyprogesterone acetate and norethisterone.

Side effects of progestogens include menstrual irregularities, headaches, nausea, breast tenderness, mood changes, acne, increased hair growth, and changes in liver protein production among others. Other side effects of progestogens may include an increased risk of breast cancer, cardiovascular disease, and blood clots. At high doses, progestogens can cause low sex hormone levels and associated side effects like sexual dysfunction and an increased risk of bone fractures.

Progestogens are agonists of the progesterone receptors (PRs) and produce progestogenic, or progestational, effects. They have important effects in the female reproductive system (uterus, cervix, and vagina), the breasts, and the brain. In addition, many progestogens also have other hormonal activities, such as androgenic, antiandrogenic, estrogenic, glucocorticoid, or antimineralocorticoid activity. They also have antigonadotropic effects and at high doses can strongly suppress sex hormone production. Progestogens mediate their contraceptive effects both by inhibiting ovulation and by thickening cervical mucus, thereby preventing fertilization. They have functional antiestrogenic effects in certain tissues like the endometrium, and this underlies their use in menopausal hormone therapy.

Progesterone was first isolated for medical use in 1934 and the first progestin, ethisterone, was introduced for medical use in 1939. More potent progestins, such as norethisterone, were developed and started to be used in birth control in the 1950s. Around 60 progestins have been marketed for clinical use in humans or use in veterinary medicine. These progestins can be grouped into different classes and generations. Progestogens are available widely throughout the world and are used in all forms of hormonal birth control and in most menopausal hormone therapy regimens.

== Medical uses ==
=== Available forms ===
Progestogens marketed for clinical or veterinary use
Generic name	Class (Note: Classes: P = progesterone derivative, T = testosterone derivative)	Brand name	Route (Note: Routes: IUD = intrauterine device, PO = by mouth, SC = subcutaneous injection or implant, SL = under the tongue, TD = transdermal, V = vaginal)	Intr.
Acetomepregenol	P (Note: 17α-hydroxy) (Note: Ester)	Diamol	PO	1981
Algestone acetophenide	P (Note: Cyclic ketal)	Deladroxate (Note: Also marketed under other brand names.)	IM	1964
Allylestrenol	T (Note: 19-nor) (Note: estrane)	Gestanin	PO	1961
Altrenogest (Note: Veterinary use only.)	T	Regumate	PO	1980s
Chlormadinone acetate	P	Belara	PO	1965
Cyproterone acetate	P	Androcur	PO, IM	1973
Danazol	T	Danocrine	PO	1971
Delmadinone acetate	P	Tardak	PO	1972
Desogestrel	T (Note: Gonane)	Cerazette	PO	1981
Dienogest	T	Natazia	PO	1995
Drospirenone	S (Note: Spironolactone)	Angeliq	PO	2000
Dydrogesterone	RP	Duphaston	PO	1961
Etonogestrel	T	Implanon (SC), NuvaRing (V)	SC, V	1998
Etynodiol diacetate	T	Demulen	PO	1965
Flugestone acetate	P	Chronogest	PO	1960s
Gestodene	T	Femodene	PO	1987
Gestonorone caproate	P (Note: 19-nor)	Depostat	IM	1968
Gestrinone	T	Dimetriose	PO	1986
Hydroxyprogesterone caproate	P	Makena	IM	1954
Levonorgestrel	T	Plan B	PO, TD, IUD, SC	1970
Lynestrenol	T	Exluton	PO	1961
Medrogestone	P (Note: 17α-methyl)	Colprone	PO	1966
Medroxyprogesterone acetate	P	Provera	PO, IM, SC	1958
Megestrol acetate	P	Megace	PO, IM	1963
Melengestrol acetate	P	Heifermax	IM	1960s
Nomegestrol acetate	P	Lutenyl	PO	1986
Norelgestromin	T	Evra	TD patch	2002
Norethisterone	T	Aygestin	PO	1957
Norethisterone acetate	T	Primolut-Nor	PO, TD patch	1964
Norethisterone enanthate	T	Noristerat	IM	1957
Norgestimate	T	Ortho-Cyclen	PO	1986
Norgestomet	P	Syncro-Mate B	PO	1970s
Norgestrel	T	Ovral	PO	1966
Normethandrone	T	Metalutin	PO	1957
Osaterone acetate	P	Ypozane	PO	2007
Oxendolone	T	Prostetin	IM	1981
Progesterone	BI	Prometrium	PO, V, IM	1934
Proligestone	P	Corvinan	PO	1975
Promegestone	P	Surgestone	PO	1983
Segesterone acetate	P	Elcometrine	SC, V	2000
Tibolone	T	Livial	PO	1988
Trimegestone	P	Lovelle	PO	2001
Legend for class of molecule

Progestogens are available in many different forms for use by many different routes of administration. These include oral tablets and capsules, oil and aqueous solutions and suspensions for intramuscular or subcutaneous injection, and various others (e.g., transdermal patches, vaginal rings, intrauterine devices, subcutaneous implants).

Dozens of different progestogens have been marketed for clinical and/or veterinary use.

=== Birth control ===
Progestogens are used in a variety of different forms of hormonal birth control for females, including combined estrogen and progestogen forms like combined oral contraceptive pills, combined contraceptive patches, combined contraceptive vaginal rings, and combined injectable contraceptives; and progestogen-only forms like progestogen-only contraceptive pills ("mini-pills"), progestogen-only emergency contraceptive pills ("day-after pills"), progestogen-only contraceptive implants, progestogen-only intrauterine devices, progestogen-only contraceptive vaginal rings, and progestogen-only injectable contraceptives.

Progestogens mediate their contraceptive effects by multiple mechanisms, including prevention of ovulation via their antigonadotropic effects; thickening of cervical mucus, making the cervix largely impenetrable to sperm; preventing capacitation of sperm due to changes in cervical fluid, thereby making sperm unable to penetrate the ovum; and atrophic changes in the endometrium, making the endometrium unsuitable for implantation. They may also decrease tubal motility and ciliary action.

=== Hormone therapy ===
==== Menopause and hypogonadism ====
Progestogens are used in combination with estrogens in menopausal hormone therapy in women. They are also used in combination with estrogens in hormone therapy for hypogonadism and delayed puberty in girls and women. They are used mainly to prevent endometrial hyperplasia and increased risk of endometrial cancer from unopposed estrogen therapy.

==== Transgender hormone therapy ====
Progestogens are used as a component of hormone therapy for transgender women and transgender men. They are used in transgender women in combination with estrogens to help suppress and block testosterone. Progestogens might also have other beneficial effects in transgender women, such as improved breast growth, but there is insufficient research to prove or disprove these claims. Examples of progestogens used in hormone therapy for transgender women include cyproterone acetate, medroxyprogesterone acetate, and progesterone. Progestogens, such as medroxyprogesterone and lynestrenol, are used in transgender men to help suppress menses. Progestogens have also been used to delay puberty in transgender boys and girls.

==== Other uses ====
Certain progestogens, including megestrol acetate, medroxyprogesterone acetate, cyproterone acetate, and chlormadinone acetate, have been used at high doses to reduce hot flashes in men undergoing androgen deprivation therapy, for instance to treat prostate cancer.

=== Gynecological disorders ===
==== Menstrual disorders ====
Progestogens are used to treat menstrual disorders such as secondary amenorrhea and dysfunctional uterine bleeding. In a normal menstrual cycle, declining levels of progesterone trigger menstruation. Progestogens such as norethisterone acetate and medroxyprogesterone acetate may be used to artificially induce progesterone-associated breakthrough bleeding.

The progestogen challenge test or progestogen withdrawal test is used to diagnose amenorrhea. Due to the availability of assays to measure estrogen levels, it is now rarely used.

==== Uterine disorders ====
Progestogens are used in the prevention and treatment of uterine disorders such as endometrial hyperplasia, endometriosis, uterine fibroids, and uterine hypoplasia.

==== Breast disorders ====
Progestogens are used to treat benign breast disorders. They are associated not only with a reduction in breast pain, but also a decrease in breast cell proliferation, a decrease in breast gland size, and a disappearance of breast nodularity. Progestogens that have been used for such purposes include topical progesterone, dydrogesterone, promegestone, lynestrenol, medroxyprogesterone acetate, dienogest, and medrogestone.

Progestogens are used in the treatment of breast hypoplasia and lactation insufficiency. This is because they induce lobuloalveolar development of the breasts, which is required for lactation and breastfeeding.

=== Enlarged prostate ===
Progestogens have been used at high doses to treat benign prostatic hyperplasia (BPH). They act by suppressing gonadal testosterone production and hence circulating testosterone levels. Androgens like testosterone stimulate the growth of the prostate gland.

=== Hormone-sensitive cancers ===
==== Endometrial cancer ====
Progestogens were first found to be effective at high doses in the treatment of endometrial hyperplasia and endometrial cancer in 1959. Subsequently, high-dose gestonorone caproate, hydroxyprogesterone caproate, medroxyprogesterone acetate, and megestrol acetate were approved for the treatment of endometrial cancer.

==== Breast cancer ====
Progestogens, such as megestrol acetate and medroxyprogesterone acetate, are effective at high doses in the treatment of advanced postmenopausal breast cancer. They have been extensively evaluated as a second-line therapy for this indication. However, they produce various side effects, such as dyspnea, weight gain, vaginal bleeding, nausea, fluid retention, hypertension, thrombophlebitis, and thromboembolic complications. In addition, megestrol acetate has been found to be significantly inferior to aromatase inhibitors in the treatment of breast cancer, and in relation to this, progestogens have been moved down in the sequential therapy of the disease. Megestrol acetate is the only Food and Drug Administration-approved progestogen for breast cancer. The mechanism of action of progestogens in the treatment of breast cancer is unknown, but may be related to their functional antiestrogenic and/or antigonadotropic effects.

==== Prostate cancer ====
Certain progestogens, particularly those with antiandrogenic properties, have been used at high doses in the treatment of prostate cancer. These include cyproterone acetate, chlormadinone acetate, and megestrol acetate. Other progestogens such as medroxyprogesterone acetate, hydroxyprogesterone caproate, and gestonorone caproate have also been studied, but have inadequate effectiveness. They act by suppressing gonadal testosterone production and hence circulating testosterone levels. Androgens like testosterone stimulate the growth of prostate tumors.

=== Fertility and pregnancy ===
Progestogens are used in fertility medicine for women. For example, progesterone (or sometimes dydrogesterone or hydroxyprogesterone caproate) is used for luteal support in in-vitro fertilization protocols.

Certain progestogens are used to support pregnancy, including progesterone, hydroxyprogesterone caproate, dydrogesterone, and allylestrenol. They are used questionably for treatment of recurrent pregnancy loss and for prevention of preterm birth in pregnant women with a history of at least one spontaneous preterm birth.

=== Puberty suppression ===
Progestogens have been used to treat precocious puberty in both boys and girls. They have also been used to delay puberty in transgender youth.

=== Sexual deviance ===
Certain progestogens, such as cyproterone acetate and medroxyprogesterone acetate, are used as a form of chemical castration to treat sexual deviance in men, particularly sex offenders. They are specifically used to treat paraphilias and hypersexuality. They work by suppressing gonadal testosterone production and hence circulating testosterone levels. This results in decreased libido and interference with erectile function and ability to attain orgasm.

=== Skin and hair conditions ===
Progestogens are used to treat androgen-dependent skin and hair conditions in women. These include oily skin, acne, seborrhea, hirsutism, scalp hair loss, and hidradenitis suppurativa. They act by suppressing testosterone levels and, in the case of antiandrogenic progestogens, by directly blocking the actions of androgens.

=== Androgen excess ===
Progestogens are used to treat hyperandrogenism, such as due to polyendocrine metabolic ovarian syndrome (PMOS) and congenital adrenal hyperplasia, in women. Examples include cyproterone acetate and chlormadinone acetate.

=== Appetite stimulation ===
Certain progestins can be used at very high doses to increase appetite in conditions like cachexia, anorexia, and wasting syndromes. In general, they are used in combination with certain other steroid medications such as dexamethasone. Their effects take several weeks to become apparent, but are relatively long-lived when compared to those of corticosteroids. Furthermore, they are recognized as being the only medications to increase lean body mass. Megestrol acetate is the lead drug of this class for the management of cachexia, and medroxyprogesterone acetate is also used. The mechanism of action of the appetite-related effects of these two medications is unknown and may not be related to their progestogenic activity. Very high doses of other progestogens, like cyproterone acetate, have minimal or no influence on appetite and weight.

== Contraindications ==
Contraindications of progestogens may include breast cancer and a history of venous thromboembolism among others.

== Side effects ==
Progestogens have relatively few side effects at typical dosages. Side effects of progestogens may include tiredness, dysphoria, depression, mood changes, menstrual irregularities, hypomenorrhea, edema, vaginal dryness, vaginal atrophy, headaches, nausea, breast tenderness, decreased libido. Progestins with androgenic activity, namely 19-nortestosterone derivatives, can also cause acne, hirsutism, seborrhea, voice deepening, changes in liver protein production (e.g., decreased HDL cholesterol, sex hormone-binding globulin), increased appetite, and weight gain, among others. Other side effects of progestogens may include an increased risk of breast cancer, cardiovascular disease, and blood clots, among others. Some of the side effects of progestogens are due not to their progestogenic activity but rather due to off-target activities (e.g., androgenic activity, glucocorticoid activity, antimineralocorticoid activity). At high doses, due to their antigonadotropic effects, progestogens can cause low sex hormone levels and associated side effects like diminished secondary sexual characteristics, sexual dysfunction (e.g., reduced sex drive and erectile dysfunction), reversible infertility, reduced bone mineral density, and an increased risk of bone fractures, both in men and in premenopausal women.

Results of the Women's Health Initiative (WHI) menopausal hormone therapy randomized controlled trials
Clinical outcome	Hypothesized effect on risk	Estrogen and progestogen (CEs 0.625 mg/day p.o. + MPA 2.5 mg/day p.o.) (n = 16,608, with uterus, 5.2–5.6 years follow up)			Estrogen alone (CEs 0.625 mg/day p.o.) (n = 10,739, no uterus, 6.8–7.1 years follow up)		
Clinical outcome	Hypothesized effect on risk	HR	95% CI	AR	HR	95% CI	AR
Coronary heart disease	Decreased	1.24	1.00–1.54	+6 / 10,000 PYs	0.95	0.79–1.15	−3 / 10,000 PYs
Stroke	Decreased	1.31	1.02–1.68	+8 / 10,000 PYs	1.37	1.09–1.73	+12 / 10,000 PYs
Pulmonary embolism	Increased	2.13	1.45–3.11	+10 / 10,000 PYs	1.37	0.90–2.07	+4 / 10,000 PYs
Venous thromboembolism	Increased	2.06	1.57–2.70	+18 / 10,000 PYs	1.32	0.99–1.75	+8 / 10,000 PYs
Breast cancer	Increased	1.24	1.02–1.50	+8 / 10,000 PYs	0.80	0.62–1.04	−6 / 10,000 PYs
Colorectal cancer	Decreased	0.56	0.38–0.81	−7 / 10,000 PYs	1.08	0.75–1.55	+1 / 10,000 PYs
Endometrial cancer	–	0.81	0.48–1.36	−1 / 10,000 PYs	–	–	–
Hip fractures	Decreased	0.67	0.47–0.96	−5 / 10,000 PYs	0.65	0.45–0.94	−7 / 10,000 PYs
Total fractures	Decreased	0.76	0.69–0.83	−47 / 10,000 PYs	0.71	0.64–0.80	−53 / 10,000 PYs
Total mortality	Decreased	0.98	0.82–1.18	−1 / 10,000 PYs	1.04	0.91–1.12	+3 / 10,000 PYs
Global index	–	1.15	1.03–1.28	+19 / 10,000 PYs	1.01	1.09–1.12	+2 / 10,000 PYs
Diabetes	–	0.79	0.67–0.93		0.88	0.77–1.01	
Gallbladder disease	Increased	1.59	1.28–1.97		1.67	1.35–2.06	
Stress incontinence	–	1.87	1.61–2.18		2.15	1.77–2.82	
Urge incontinence	–	1.15	0.99–1.34		1.32	1.10–1.58	
Peripheral artery disease	–	0.89	0.63–1.25		1.32	0.99–1.77	
Probable dementia	Decreased	2.05	1.21–3.48		1.49	0.83–2.66	
Abbreviations: CEs = conjugated estrogens. MPA = medroxyprogesterone acetate. p.o. = per oral. HR = hazard ratio. AR = attributable risk. PYs = person–years. CI = confidence interval. Notes: Sample sizes (n) include placebo recipients, which were about half of patients. "Global index" is defined for each woman as the time to earliest diagnosis for coronary heart disease, stroke, pulmonary embolism, breast cancer, colorectal cancer, endometrial cancer (estrogen plus progestogen group only), hip fractures, and death from other causes. Sources: See template.

=== Mood changes ===
==== Birth control ====
The available evidence on the risk of mood changes and depression with progestogens in hormonal birth control is limited. As of 2019, there is no consistent evidence for adverse effects on mood of hormonal birth control, including progestogen-only birth control and combined birth control, in the general population. Most women taking combined birth control experience no influence or a beneficial effect on mood. Adverse effects on mood appear to be infrequent, occurring only in a small percentage of women. About 5 to 10% of women experience negative mood changes with combined birth control pills, and about 5% of women discontinue birth control pills due to such changes. A study of about 4,000 women found that progestogen-only birth control with depot medroxyprogesterone acetate had an incidence of depression of 1.5% and discontinuation due to depression of 0.5%. Beneficial effects of hormonal birth control such as decreased menstrual pain and bleeding may positively influence mood.

A 2018 systematic review of 26 studies, including 5 randomized controlled trials and 21 observational studies, found that the overall evidence showed no association between progestogen-only birth control and depression. The progestins assessed included depot medroxyprogesterone acetate, levonorgestrel-containing contraceptive implants and intrauterine devices, and progestogen-only birth control pills. Findings of large observational studies are mixed due to prominent confounding factors, but overall show no association of hormonal birth control with depression. Randomized controlled trials typically do not find clinically significant influences of hormonal birth control on mood. Reviews from before 1980 reported a high incidence of adverse mood effects with combined birth control pills. However, doses of estrogens and progestogens in birth control pills before 1980 were considerably higher than those used today, and these doses frequently caused unpleasant side effects that may have unfavorably influenced mood.

Mood with birth control pills may be better with monophasic and continuous formulations than with triphasic and cyclic formulations. Limited and inconsistent evidence supports differences in mood with hormonal birth control using different doses of ethinylestradiol or different routes of administration, such as birth control pills versus contraceptive vaginal rings and contraceptive patches. Combined birth control with less androgenic or antiandrogenic progestins like desogestrel, gestodene, and drospirenone may have a more favorable influence on mood than birth control with more androgenic progestins like levonorgestrel. However, androgen supplementation with hormonal birth control has also been reported to improve mood.

Hormonal birth control that suppresses ovulation is effective in the treatment of premenstrual dysphoric disorder (PMDD). Combined birth control pills containing drospirenone are approved for the treatment of PMDD and may be particularly beneficial due to the antimineralocorticoid activity of drospirenone. Studies on the influence of hormonal birth control on mood in women with existing mood disorders or polyendocrine metabolic ovarian syndrome (PMOS) are limited and mixed. Women with underlying mood disorders may be more likely to experience mood changes with hormonal birth control. A 2016 systematic review found based on limited evidence from 6 studies that hormonal birth control, including combined birth control pills, depot medroxyprogesterone acetate, and levonorgestrel-containing intrauterine devices, was not associated with worse outcomes compared to non-use in women with depressive or bipolar disorders. A 2008 Cochrane review found a greater likelihood of postpartum depression in women given norethisterone enanthate as a form of progestogen-only injectable birth control, and recommended caution on the use of progestogen-only birth control in the postpartum period.

Studies suggest a negativity bias in emotion recognition and reactivity with hormonal birth control. Some data suggests blunted reward responses and potential dysregulation of the stress response with hormonal birth control in some women.

==== Hormone therapy ====
Estrogen therapy appears to have a beneficial influence on mood in depressed and euthymic perimenopausal women. Conversely, research on combined estrogen and progestogen therapy for depressive symptoms in menopausal women is scarce and inconclusive. Some researchers contend that progestogens have an adverse influence on mood and reduce the benefits of estrogens on mood, whereas other researchers maintain that progestogens have no adverse influence on mood. Progesterone differs from progestins in terms of effects in the brain and might have different effects on mood in comparison. The available evidence, although limited, suggests no adverse influence of progesterone on mood when used in menopausal hormone therapy.

=== Sexual function ===
In most women, sexual desire is unchanged or increased with combined birth control pills. This is despite an increase in sex hormone-binding globulin (SHBG) levels and a decrease in total and free testosterone levels. However, findings are conflicting, and more research is needed.

=== Blood clots ===
Venous thromboembolism (VTE) consists of deep vein thrombosis (DVT) and pulmonary embolism (PE). DVT is a blood clot in a deep vein, most commonly in the legs, while PE occurs when a clot breaks free and blocks an artery in the lungs. VTE is a rare but potentially fatal cardiovascular event. Estrogens and progestogens can increase coagulation by modulating synthesis of coagulation factors. As a result, they increase the risk of VTE, especially during pregnancy when estrogen and progesterone levels are very high as well as during the postpartum period. Physiological levels of estrogen and/or progesterone may also influence risk of VTE—with late menopause (≥55 years) being associated with greater risk than early menopause (≤45 years).

==== Progestogen monotherapy ====
Progestogens when used by themselves at typical clinical dosages, for instance in progestogen-only birth control, do not affect coagulation and are not generally associated with a higher risk of venous thromboembolism (VTE). An exception is medroxyprogesterone acetate as a progestogen-only injectable contraceptive, which has been associated with a 2- to 4-fold increase in risk of VTE relative to other progestogens and non-use. The reasons for this are unknown, but the observations might be a statistical artifact of preferential prescription of depot medroxyprogesterone acetate to women at risk for VTE. Alternatively, medroxyprogesterone acetate may be an exception among progestogens in terms of influence on VTE risk, possibly due to its partial glucocorticoid activity. In contrast to depot medroxyprogesterone acetate, no increase in VTE risk has been observed with moderately high doses of the related progestin chlormadinone acetate (10 mg/day for 18–20 days/cycle), though based on limited data.

Very-high-dose progestogen therapy, including with medroxyprogesterone acetate, megestrol acetate, and cyproterone acetate, has been associated with activation of coagulation and a dose-dependent increased risk of VTE. In studies with high-dose cyproterone acetate specifically, the increase in VTE risk has ranged from 3- to 5-fold. The incidence of VTE in studies with very-high-dose progestogen therapy has been found to range from 2 to 8%. However, the relevant patient populations, namely aged individuals with cancer, are already predisposed to VTE, and this greatly amplifies the risk.

==== Estrogen plus progestogen therapy ====
In contrast to progestogen-only birth control, the addition of progestins to oral estrogen therapy, including in combined birth control pills and menopausal hormone therapy, is associated with a higher risk of VTE than with oral estrogen therapy alone. The risk of VTE is increased by about 2-fold or less with such regimens in menopausal hormone therapy and by 2- to 4-fold with combined birth control pills containing ethinylestradiol, both relative to non-use. In contrast to oral estrogen therapy, parenteral estradiol, such as with transdermal estradiol, is not associated with a higher risk of VTE. This is likely due to its lack of first-pass effect in the liver. Research is mixed on whether addition of progestins to transdermal estradiol is associated with a greater risk of VTE, with some studies finding no increase in risk and others finding higher risk. Unlike the case of transdermal estradiol, VTE risk is not lower with ethinylestradiol-containing contraceptive vaginal rings and contraceptive patches compared to combined birth control pills with ethinylestradiol. This is thought to be due to the resistance of ethinylestradiol to hepatic metabolism.

The type of progestin in combined birth control may modulate the risk of VTE. Studies have found that combined birth control pills containing newer-generation progestins such as desogestrel, gestodene, norgestimate, drospirenone, and cyproterone acetate are associated with a 1.5- to 3-fold higher risk of VTE than birth control pills containing first-generation progestins such as levonorgestrel and norethisterone. However, although this has been apparent in retrospective cohort and nested case–control studies, no greater risk of VTE has been observed in prospective cohort and case–control studies. These kinds of observational studies have certain advantages over the aforementioned types of studies, such as better ability to control for confounding factors like new-user bias. As such, it is unclear whether the higher risk of VTE with newer-generation birth control pills is a real finding or a statistical artifact. Androgenic progestins have been found to antagonize to some degree the effect of estrogens on coagulation. First-generation progestins are more androgenic, while newer-generation progestins are weakly androgenic or antiandrogenic, and this might explain the observed differences in risk of VTE. The type of estrogen also influences VTE risk. Birth control pills containing estradiol valerate are associated with about half the VTE risk of birth control pills with ethinylestradiol.

The type of progestogen in combined menopausal hormone therapy may also modulate VTE risk. Oral estrogens plus dydrogesterone appears to have lower VTE risk relative to inclusion of other progestins. Norpregnane derivatives such as nomegestrol acetate and promegestone have been associated with a significantly greater risk of VTE than pregnane derivatives such as medroxyprogesterone acetate and dydrogesterone and nortestosterone derivatives such as norethisterone and levonorgestrel. However, these findings may just be statistical artifacts. In contrast to progestins, the addition of oral progesterone to either oral or transdermal estrogen therapy is not associated with a higher risk of VTE. However, oral progesterone achieves very low progesterone levels and has relatively weak progestogenic effects, which might be responsible for the absence of increase in VTE risk. Parenteral progesterone, such as vaginal or injectable progesterone, which can achieve luteal-phase levels of progesterone and associated progestogenic effects, has not been characterized in terms of VTE risk.

A 2012 meta-analysis estimated that the absolute risk of VTE is 2 per 10,000 women for non-use, 8 per 10,000 women for ethinylestradiol and levonorgestrel-containing birth control pills, and 10 to 15 per 10,000 women for birth control pills containing ethinylestradiol and a newer-generation progestin. For comparison, the absolute risk of VTE is generally estimated as 1 to 5 per 10,000 woman-years for non-use, 5 to 20 per 10,000 woman-years for pregnancy, and 40 to 65 per 10,000 woman-years for the postpartum period. Risk of VTE with estrogen and progestogen therapy is highest at the start of treatment, particularly during the first year, and decreases over time. Older age, higher body weight, lower physical activity, and smoking are all associated with a higher risk of VTE with oral estrogen and progestogen therapy. Women with thrombophilia have a dramatically higher risk of VTE with estrogen and progestogen therapy than women without thrombophilia. Depending on the condition, risk of VTE can be increased as much as 50-fold in such women relative to non-use.

Estrogens induce the production of sex hormone-binding globulin (SHBG) in the liver. As such, SHBG levels indicate hepatic estrogenic exposure and may be a reliable surrogate marker for coagulation and VTE risk with estrogen therapy. Combined birth control pills containing different progestins result in SHBG levels that are increased 1.5- to 2-fold with levonorgestrel, 2.5- to 4-fold with desogestrel and gestodene, 3.5- to 4-fold with drospirenone and dienogest, and 4- to 5-fold with cyproterone acetate. SHBG levels differ depending on the progestin because androgenic progestins oppose the effect of ethinylestradiol on hepatic SHBG production as with its procoagulatory effects. Contraceptive vaginal rings and contraceptive patches likewise have been found to increase SHBG levels by 2.5-fold and 3.5-fold, respectively. Birth control pills containing high doses of ethinylestradiol (>50 μg) can increase SHBG levels by 5- to 10-fold, which is similar to the increase that occurs during pregnancy. Conversely, increases in SHBG levels are much lower with estradiol, especially when it is used parenterally. Estradiol-containing combined birth control pills, like estradiol valerate/dienogest and estradiol/nomegestrol acetate, and high-dose parenteral polyestradiol phosphate therapy have both been found to increase SHBG levels by about 1.5-fold.

Hormone therapy with high-dose ethinylestradiol and cyproterone acetate in transgender women has been associated with a 20- to 45-fold higher risk of VTE relative to non-use. The absolute incidence was about 6%. Conversely, the risk of VTE in transgender women is much lower with oral or transdermal estradiol plus high-dose cyproterone acetate. Ethinylestradiol is thought to have been primarily responsible for the VTE risk, but cyproterone acetate may have contributed as well. Ethinylestradiol is no longer used in transgender hormone therapy, and doses of cyproterone acetate have been reduced.

Risk of venous thromboembolism (VTE) with hormone therapy and birth control (QResearch/CPRD)
Type	Route	Medications	Odds ratio (95% CI)
Menopausal hormone therapy	Oral	Estradiol alone ≤1 mg/day >1 mg/day	1.27 (1.16–1.39)*; 1.22 (1.09–1.37)*; 1.35 (1.18–1.55)*
Menopausal hormone therapy	Oral	Conjugated estrogens alone ≤0.625 mg/day >0.625 mg/day	1.49 (1.39–1.60)*; 1.40 (1.28–1.53)*; 1.71 (1.51–1.93)*
Menopausal hormone therapy	Oral	Estradiol/medroxyprogesterone acetate	1.44 (1.09–1.89)*
Menopausal hormone therapy	Oral	Estradiol/dydrogesterone ≤1 mg/day E2 >1 mg/day E2	1.18 (0.98–1.42); 1.12 (0.90–1.40); 1.34 (0.94–1.90)
Menopausal hormone therapy	Oral	Estradiol/norethisterone ≤1 mg/day E2 >1 mg/day E2	1.68 (1.57–1.80)*; 1.38 (1.23–1.56)*; 1.84 (1.69–2.00)*
Menopausal hormone therapy	Oral	Estradiol/norgestrel or estradiol/drospirenone	1.42 (1.00–2.03)
Menopausal hormone therapy	Oral	Conjugated estrogens/medroxyprogesterone acetate	2.10 (1.92–2.31)*
Menopausal hormone therapy	Oral	Conjugated estrogens/norgestrel ≤0.625 mg/day CEEs >0.625 mg/day CEEs	1.73 (1.57–1.91)*; 1.53 (1.36–1.72)*; 2.38 (1.99–2.85)*
Menopausal hormone therapy	Oral	Tibolone alone	1.02 (0.90–1.15)
Menopausal hormone therapy	Oral	Raloxifene alone	1.49 (1.24–1.79)*
Menopausal hormone therapy	Transdermal	Estradiol alone ≤50 μg/day >50 μg/day	0.96 (0.88–1.04); 0.94 (0.85–1.03); 1.05 (0.88–1.24)
Menopausal hormone therapy	Transdermal	Estradiol/progestogen	0.88 (0.73–1.01)
Menopausal hormone therapy	Vaginal	Estradiol alone	0.84 (0.73–0.97)
Menopausal hormone therapy	Vaginal	Conjugated estrogens alone	1.04 (0.76–1.43)
Combined birth control	Oral	Ethinylestradiol/norethisterone	2.56 (2.15–3.06)*
Combined birth control	Oral	Ethinylestradiol/levonorgestrel	2.38 (2.18–2.59)*
Combined birth control	Oral	Ethinylestradiol/norgestimate	2.53 (2.17–2.96)*
Combined birth control	Oral	Ethinylestradiol/desogestrel	4.28 (3.66–5.01)*
Combined birth control	Oral	Ethinylestradiol/gestodene	3.64 (3.00–4.43)*
Combined birth control	Oral	Ethinylestradiol/drospirenone	4.12 (3.43–4.96)*
Combined birth control	Oral	Ethinylestradiol/cyproterone acetate	4.27 (3.57–5.11)*
Notes: (1) Nested case–control studies (2015, 2019) based on data from the QResearch and Clinical Practice Research Datalink (CPRD) databases. (2) Bioidentical progesterone was not included, but is known to be associated with no additional risk relative to estrogen alone. Footnotes: * = Statistically significant (p < 0.01). Sources: See template.

=== Cardiovascular health ===
Progestogens may influence the risk of cardiovascular disease in women. In the women's Health Initiative (WHI), the risk of coronary heart disease was greater with the combination of estrogen plus a progestin (specifically medroxyprogesterone acetate) than with estrogen alone. However, progestogens have varying activities and may differ in terms of cardiovascular risk. A 2015 Cochrane review provided strong evidence that the treatment of post-menopausal women with hormone therapy for cardiovascular disease had little if any effect and increased the risk of stroke and venous thromboembolic events. It is thought that androgenic progestins like medroxyprogesterone acetate and norethisterone may antagonize the beneficial effects of estrogens on biomarkers of cardiovascular health (e.g., favorable lipid profile changes). However, these findings are mixed and controversial. Differences of progestogens on cardiovascular health and risk have been reviewed and summarized:

"Unfortunately, there are few long-term clinical studies comparing different progestogens used in [hormone therapy] with respect to cardiovascular outcomes. However, some aspects of potential cardiovascular risk have been examined, namely effects on lipids, vascular function/blood pressure, inflammation, thrombosis, and carbohydrate metabolism. [...] Although progestins have differing effects on aspects of cardiovascular risk, in general, those more similar to progesterone have been associated with a lower impact than the more androgenic progestins on the beneficial effects of concomitant estrogen therapy. However, the limited number of long-term clinical studies makes it difficult to extrapolate the short-term effects on various markers of cardiovascular risk to long-term cardiovascular morbidity."

Route of administration might also influence the cardiovascular health effects of progestogens, but more research is needed similarly.

=== Breast cancer ===
Estrogen alone, progestogen alone, and combined estrogen and progestogen therapy are all associated with increased risks of breast cancer when used in menopausal hormone therapy for peri- and postmenopausal women relative to non-use. These risks are higher for combined estrogen and progestogen therapy than with estrogen alone or progestogen alone. In addition to breast cancer risk, estrogen alone and estrogen plus progestogen therapy are associated with higher breast cancer mortality. With 20 years of use, breast cancer incidence is about 1.5-fold higher with estrogen alone and about 2.5-fold higher with estrogen plus progestogen therapy relative to non-use. The increase in breast cancer risk with estrogen and progestogen therapy was shown to be causal with conjugated estrogens plus medroxyprogesterone acetate in the Women's Health Initiative randomized controlled trials.

Breast cancer risk with combined estrogen and progestogen therapy may differ depending on the progestogen used. Progestins including chlormadinone acetate, cyproterone acetate, medrogestone, medroxyprogesterone acetate, nomegestrol acetate, norethisterone acetate, promegestone, and tibolone have all been associated with similarly increased risk of breast cancer. Some research has found that oral progesterone and dydrogesterone with short-term use (<5 years) may be associated with lower risk of breast cancer relative to other progestins. In the long-term however (>5 years), oral progesterone and dydrogesterone have been associated with significantly increased breast cancer risk similarly to other progestogens. The lower risk of breast cancer with oral progesterone than with other progestogens may be related to the very low progesterone levels and relatively weak progestogenic effects it produces.

The risk of breast cancer with estrogen and progestogen therapy in peri- and postmenopausal women is dependent on the duration of treatment, with more than 5 years of use being associated with significantly greater risk than less than five years of use. In addition, continuous estrogen and progestogen therapy is associated with a higher risk of breast cancer than cyclic use.

A nationwide observational study found that transfeminine hormone therapy with estrogen plus high-dose cyproterone acetate was associated with a 46-fold increased risk of breast cancer in transgender women relative to the expected incidence for cisgender men. However, the risk of breast cancer was still lower than that in cisgender women. The extent to which the increase in breast cancer risk was related to estrogen versus cyproterone acetate is unknown.

Worldwide epidemiological evidence on breast cancer risk with menopausal hormone therapy (CGHFBC, 2019)
Therapy	<5 years		5–14 years		15+ years	
Therapy	Cases	RR (95% CI)	Cases	RR (95% CI)	Cases	RR (95% CI)
Estrogen alone	1259	1.18 (1.10–1.26)	4869	1.33 (1.28–1.37)	2183	1.58 (1.51–1.67)
By estrogen						
Conjugated estrogens	481	1.22 (1.09–1.35)	1910	1.32 (1.25–1.39)	1179	1.68 (1.57–1.80)
Estradiol	346	1.20 (1.05–1.36)	1580	1.38 (1.30–1.46)	435	1.78 (1.58–1.99)
Estropipate (estrone sulfate)	9	1.45 (0.67–3.15)	50	1.09 (0.79–1.51)	28	1.53 (1.01–2.33)
Estriol	15	1.21 (0.68–2.14)	44	1.24 (0.89–1.73)	9	1.41 (0.67–2.93)
Other estrogens	15	0.98 (0.46–2.09)	21	0.98 (0.58–1.66)	5	0.77 (0.27–2.21)
By route						
Oral estrogens	–	–	3633	1.33 (1.27–1.38)	–	–
Transdermal estrogens	–	–	919	1.35 (1.25–1.46)	–	–
Vaginal estrogens	–	–	437	1.09 (0.97–1.23)	–	–
Estrogen and progestogen	2419	1.58 (1.51–1.67)	8319	2.08 (2.02–2.15)	1424	2.51 (2.34–2.68)
By progestogen						
(Levo)norgestrel	343	1.70 (1.49–1.94)	1735	2.12 (1.99–2.25)	219	2.69 (2.27–3.18)
Norethisterone acetate	650	1.61 (1.46–1.77)	2642	2.20 (2.09–2.32)	420	2.97 (2.60–3.39)
Medroxyprogesterone acetate	714	1.64 (1.50–1.79)	2012	2.07 (1.96–2.19)	411	2.71 (2.39–3.07)
Dydrogesterone	65	1.21 (0.90–1.61)	162	1.41 (1.17–1.71)	26	2.23 (1.32–3.76)
Progesterone	11	0.91 (0.47–1.78)	38	2.05 (1.38–3.06)	1	–
Promegestone	12	1.68 (0.85–3.31)	19	2.06 (1.19–3.56)	0	–
Nomegestrol acetate	8	1.60 (0.70–3.64)	14	1.38 (0.75–2.53)	0	–
Other progestogens	12	1.70 (0.86–3.38)	19	1.79 (1.05–3.05)	0	–
By progestogen frequency						
Continuous	–	–	3948	2.30 (2.21–2.40)	–	–
Intermittent	–	–	3467	1.93 (1.84–2.01)	–	–
Progestogen alone	98	1.37 (1.08–1.74)	107	1.39 (1.11–1.75)	30	2.10 (1.35–3.27)
By progestogen						
Medroxyprogesterone acetate	28	1.68 (1.06–2.66)	18	1.16 (0.68–1.98)	7	3.42 (1.26–9.30)
Norethisterone acetate	13	1.58 (0.77–3.24)	24	1.55 (0.88–2.74)	6	3.33 (0.81–13.8)
Dydrogesterone	3	2.30 (0.49–10.9)	11	3.31 (1.39–7.84)	0	–
Other progestogens	8	2.83 (1.04–7.68)	5	1.47 (0.47–4.56)	1	–
Miscellaneous						
Tibolone	–	–	680	1.57 (1.43–1.72)	–	–
Notes: Meta-analysis of worldwide epidemiological evidence on menopausal hormone therapy and breast cancer risk by the Collaborative Group on Hormonal Factors in Breast Cancer (CGHFBC). Fully adjusted relative risks for current versus never-users of menopausal hormone therapy. Source: See template.

Risk of breast cancer with menopausal hormone therapy in large observational studies (Mirkin, 2018)
Study	Therapy	Hazard ratio (95% CI)
E3N-EPIC: Fournier et al. (2005)	Estrogen alone	1.1 (0.8–1.6)
E3N-EPIC: Fournier et al. (2005)	Estrogen plus progesterone Transdermal estrogen Oral estrogen	0.9 (0.7–1.2); 0.9 (0.7–1.2); No events
E3N-EPIC: Fournier et al. (2005)	Estrogen plus progestin Transdermal estrogen Oral estrogen	1.4 (1.2–1.7); 1.4 (1.2–1.7); 1.5 (1.1–1.9)
E3N-EPIC: Fournier et al. (2008)	Oral estrogen alone	1.32 (0.76–2.29)
E3N-EPIC: Fournier et al. (2008)	Oral estrogen plus progestogen Progesterone; Dydrogesterone; Medrogestone; Chlormadinone acetate Cyproterone acetate Promegestone; Nomegestrol acetate Norethisterone acetate Medroxyprogesterone acetate	Not analyzed^{a} 0.77 (0.36–1.62); 2.74 (1.42–5.29); 2.02 (1.00–4.06); 2.57 (1.81–3.65); 1.62 (0.94–2.82); 1.10 (0.55–2.21); 2.11 (1.56–2.86); 1.48 (1.02–2.16)
E3N-EPIC: Fournier et al. (2008)	Transdermal estrogen alone	1.28 (0.98–1.69)
E3N-EPIC: Fournier et al. (2008)	Transdermal estrogen plus progestogen Progesterone; Dydrogesterone; Medrogestone; Chlormadinone acetate Cyproterone acetate Promegestone; Nomegestrol acetate Norethisterone acetate Medroxyprogesterone acetate	1.08 (0.89–1.31); 1.18 (0.95–1.48); 2.03 (1.39–2.97); 1.48 (1.05–2.09); Not analyzed^{a} 1.52 (1.19–1.96); 1.60 (1.28–2.01); Not analyzed^{a} Not analyzed^{a}
E3N-EPIC: Fournier et al. (2014)	Estrogen alone	1.17 (0.99–1.38)
E3N-EPIC: Fournier et al. (2014)	Estrogen plus progesterone or dydrogesterone	1.22 (1.11–1.35)
E3N-EPIC: Fournier et al. (2014)	Estrogen plus progestin	1.87 (1.71–2.04)
CECILE: Cordina-Duverger et al. (2013)	Estrogen alone	1.19 (0.69–2.04)
CECILE: Cordina-Duverger et al. (2013)	Estrogen plus progestogen Progesterone; Progestins; Progesterone derivatives Testosterone derivatives	1.33 (0.92–1.92); 0.80 (0.44–1.43); 1.72 (1.11–2.65); 1.57 (0.99–2.49); 3.35 (1.07–10.4)
Footnotes: ^{a} = Not analyzed, fewer than 5 cases. Sources: See template.

Risk of breast cancer with menopausal hormone therapy by duration in large observational studies (Mirkin, 2018)
Study	Therapy	Hazard ratio (95% CI)
E3N-EPIC: Fournier et al. (2005)^{a}	Transdermal estrogen plus progesterone <2 years 2–4 years ≥4 years	0.9 (0.6–1.4); 0.7 (0.4–1.2); 1.2 (0.7–2.0)
E3N-EPIC: Fournier et al. (2005)^{a}	Transdermal estrogen plus progestin <2 years 2–4 years ≥4 years	1.6 (1.3–2.0); 1.4 (1.0–1.8); 1.2 (0.8–1.7)
E3N-EPIC: Fournier et al. (2005)^{a}	Oral estrogen plus progestin <2 years 2–4 years ≥4 years	1.2 (0.9–1.8); 1.6 (1.1–2.3); 1.9 (1.2–3.2)
E3N-EPIC: Fournier et al. (2008)	Estrogen plus progesterone <2 years 2–4 years 4–6 years ≥6 years	0.71 (0.44–1.14); 0.95 (0.67–1.36); 1.26 (0.87–1.82); 1.22 (0.89–1.67)
E3N-EPIC: Fournier et al. (2008)	Estrogen plus dydrogesterone <2 years 2–4 years 4–6 years ≥6 years	0.84 (0.51–1.38); 1.16 (0.79–1.71); 1.28 (0.83–1.99); 1.32 (0.93–1.86)
E3N-EPIC: Fournier et al. (2008)	Estrogen plus other progestogens <2 years 2–4 years 4–6 years ≥6 years	1.36 (1.07–1.72); 1.59 (1.30–1.94); 1.79 (1.44–2.23); 1.95 (1.62–2.35)
E3N-EPIC: Fournier et al. (2014)	Estrogens plus progesterone or dydrogesterone <5 years ≥5 years	1.13 (0.99–1.29); 1.31 (1.15–1.48)
E3N-EPIC: Fournier et al. (2014)	Estrogen plus other progestogens <5 years ≥5 years	1.70 (1.50–1.91); 2.02 (1.81–2.26)
Footnotes: ^{a} = Oral estrogen plus progesterone was not analyzed because there was a low number of women who used this therapy. Sources: See template.

== Overdose ==
Progestogens are relatively safe in acute overdose.

== Interactions ==
Inhibitors and inducers of cytochrome P450 enzymes and other enzymes such as 5α-reductase may interact with progestogens.

== Pharmacology ==
=== Pharmacodynamics ===
Progestogens act by binding to and activating the progesterone receptors (PRs), including the PR-A, PR-B, and PR-C. Major tissues affected by progestogens include the uterus, cervix, vagina, breasts, and brain. By activating PRs in the hypothalamus and pituitary gland, progestogens suppress the secretion of gonadotropins and thereby function as antigonadotropins at sufficiently high doses. Progesterone interacts with membrane progesterone receptors, but interaction of progestins with these receptors is less clear. In addition to their progestogenic activity, many progestogens have off-target activities such as androgenic, antiandrogenic, estrogenic, glucocorticoid, and antimineralocorticoid activity.

Progestogens mediate their contraceptive effects in women both by inhibiting ovulation (via their antigonadotropic effects) and by thickening cervical mucus, thereby preventing the possibility of fertilization of the ovum by sperm. Progestogens have functional antiestrogenic effects in various tissues like the endometrium via activation of the PR, and this underlies their use in menopausal hormone therapy (to prevent unopposed estrogen-induced endometrial hyperplasia and endometrial cancer). The PRs are induced in the breasts by estrogens, and for this reason, it is assumed that progestogens cannot mediate breast changes in the absence of estrogens. The off-target activities of progestogens can contribute both to their beneficial effects and to their adverse effects.

Pharmacodynamics of progestogens
Progestogen	Class	Off-target activities					Relative binding affinities (%)						
Progestogen	Class	ES	AN	AA	GC	AM	PR	AR	ER	GR	MR	SHBG	CBG
Allylestrenol^{a}	Estrane	–	±	–	–	–	1	0	0	0	?	0	?
Chlormadinone acetate	Pregnane	–	–	+	+	–	67	5	0	8	0	0	0
Cyproterone acetate	Pregnane	–	–	++	+	–	90	6	0	6	8	0	0
Demegestone	Norpregnane	–	–	–	–	–	115	1	0	5	1–2	?	?
Desogestrel^{a}	Gonane	–	+	–	±	–	1	0	0	0	0	0	0
Dienogest	Gonane	–	–	+	–	–	5	10	0	1	0	0	0
Drospirenone	Spirolactone	–	–	+	–	+	35	65	0	6	230	0	0
Dydrogesterone^{a}	Pregnane	–	–	–	–	±	75	0	?	?	?	?	?
Ethisterone	Androstane	–	+	–	–	–	18	0	0	0	0	?	?
Etonogestrel	Gonane	–	+	–	±	–	150	20	0	14	0	15	0
Etynodiol^{a,b}	Estrane	+	+	–	–	–	1	0	11–18	0	?	?	?
Etynodiol diacetate^{a}	Estrane	+	+	–	–	–	1	0	0	0	0	?	?
Gestodene	Gonane	–	+	–	+	+	90–432	85	0	27–38	97–290	40	0
Gestonorone caproate	Pregnane	–	–	–	–	–	?	?	?	?	?	?	?
Hydroxyprogesterone caproate	Pregnane	–	–	–	–	±	?	?	?	?	?	?	?
Levonorgestrel	Gonane	–	+	–	–	–	150–162	45	0	1–8	17–75	50	0
Lynestrenol^{a}	Estrane	+	+	–	–	–	1	1	3	0	0	?	?
Medrogestone	Pregnane	–	–	±	–	–	?	?	?	?	?	?	?
Medroxyprogesterone acetate	Pregnane	–	±	–	+	–	115–149	5	0	29–58	3–160	0	0
Megestrol acetate	Pregnane	–	±	+	+	–	65	5	0	30	0	0	0
Nomegestrol acetate	Norpregnane	–	–	+	–	–	125	42	0	6	0	0	0
Norelgestromin	Gonane	–	±	–	–	–	10	0	?	?	?	0	?
Norethisterone	Estrane	+	+	–	–	–	67–75	15	0	0–1	0–3	16	0
Norethisterone acetate^{a}	Estrane	+	+	–	–	–	20	5	1	0	0	?	?
Norethisterone enanthate^{a}	Estrane	+	+	–	–	–	?	?	?	?	?	?	?
Noretynodrel^{a}	Estrane	+	±	–	–	–	6	0	2	0	0	0	0
Norgestimate^{a}	Gonane	–	+	–	–	–	15	0	0	1	0	0	0
Progesterone	Pregnane	–	–	±	+	+	50	0	0	10	100	0	36
Promegestone^{a}	Norpregnane	–	–	–	+	–	100	0	0	5	53	0	0
Segesterone acetate	Norpregnane	–	–	–	–	–	136	0	0	38	?	0	?
Tibolone^{a}	Estrane	+	++	–	–	–	6	6	1	?	?	?	
Δ^{4}-Tibolone^{b}	Estrane	–	++	–	–	–	90	35	1	0	2	1	0
Trimegestone	Norpregnane	–	–	±	–	±	294–330	1	0	9–13	42–120	?	?
Footnotes: ^{a} = Prodrug. ^{b} = Metabolite (non-marketed). Class: Pregnane = Progesterone derivative. Norpregnane = 19-Norprogesterone derivative. Androstane = Testosterone derivative. Estrane = 19-Nortestosterone derivative. Gonane = 13β-Ethylgonane = 18-Methyl-19-nortestosterone derivative. Spirolactone = Spirolactone derivative. Magnitude: ++ = High. + = Moderate. ± = Low. – = None. Activity: ES = Estrogenic. AN = Androgenic. AA = Antiandrogenic. GC = Glucocorticoid. AM = Antimineralocorticoid. Binding: PR: Promegestone = 100%. AR: Metribolone = 100%. ER: Estradiol = 100%. GR: Dexamethasone = 100%. MR: Aldosterone = 100%. SHBG: DHT = 100%. CBG: Cortisol = 100%. Sources: See template.

Oral potencies of progestogens
Compound	Doses for specific uses (mg/day) (Note: Dosages are expressed in mg/day unless otherwise noted.)					
Compound	OID	TFD		MDT	BCPD	ECD
Compound	OID	Cycle	Daily	MDT	BCPD	ECD
Allylestrenol	25	150–300	–	30	–	–
Bromoketoprogesterone (Note: Never marketed as a progestogen.)	–	–	100–160	–	–	–
Chlormadinone acetate	1.5–4.0	20–30	3–10	1.0–4.0	2.0	5–10
Cyproterone acetate	1.0	20–30	1.0–3.0	1.0–4.0	2.0	1.0
Desogestrel	0.06	0.4–2.5	0.15	0.25	0.15	0.15
Dienogest	1.0	6.0–6.3	–	–	2.0–3.0	2.0
Drospirenone	2.0	40–80	–	–	3.0	2.0
Dydrogesterone	>30	140–200	10–20	20	–	10
Ethisterone	–	200–700	50–250	–	–	–
Etynodiol diacetate	2.0	10–15	–	1.0	1.0–20	–
Gestodene	0.03	2.0–3.0	–	–	0.06–0.075	0.20
Hydroxyprogest. acetate	–	–	70–125	–	100	–
Hydroxyprogest. caproate	–	700–1400	70	–	–	–
Levonorgestrel	0.05	2.5–6.0	0.15–0.25	0.5	0.1–0.15	0.075
Lynestrenol	2.0	35–150	5.0	10	–	–
Medrogestone	10	50–100	10	15	–	10
Medroxyprogest. acetate	10	40–120	2.5–10	20–30	5–10	5.0
Megestrol acetate	>5 (Note: The exact OID of MGA is unknown, but it is known to be greater than 5 mg/day.)	30–70	–	5–10	1.0–5.0	5.0
Nomegestrol acetate	1.25–5.0	100	5.0	–	2.5	3.75–5.0
Norethandrolone	–	–	10	–	–	–
Norethisterone	0.4–0.5	100–150	5–10	10–15	0.5	0.7–1.0
Norethisterone acetate	0.5	30–60	2.5–5.0	7.5	0.6	1.0
Norethist. acetate (micron.)	–	12–14	–	–	–	–
Noretynodrel	4.0	150–200	–	14	2.5–10	–
Norgestimate	0.2	2.0–10	–	–	0.25	0.09
Norgestrel	0.1	12	–	0.5–2.0	–	–
Normethandrone	–	150	10	–	–	–
Progesterone (non-micron.)	>300 (Note: Ovulation inhibition rate with 300 to 1,000 mg/day oral non-micronized P4 was incomplete.)	–	–	–	–	–
Progesterone (micronized)	–	4200	200–300	1000	–	200
Promegestone	0.5	10	0.5	–	–	0.5
Tibolone	2.5	–	–	–	–	–
Trengestone	–	50–70	–	–	–	–
Trimegestone	0.5	–	0.25–0.5	–	–	0.0625–0.5
Notes and sources

Parenteral potencies and durations of progestogens (Note: Sources:) (Note: All given by intramuscular or subcutaneous injection.)
Compound	Form	Dose for specific uses (mg) (Note: Progesterone production during the luteal phase is ~25 (15–50) mg/day. The OID of OHPC is 250 to 500 mg/month.)			DOA (Note: Duration of action in days.)
Compound	Form	TFD (Note: Usually given for 14 days.)	POICD (Note: Usually dosed every two to three months.)	CICD (Note: Usually dosed once monthly.)	DOA
Algestone acetophenide	Oil soln.	–	–	75–150	14–32 d
Gestonorone caproate	Oil soln.	25–50	–	–	8–13 d
Hydroxyprogest. acetate (Note: Never marketed or approved by this route.)	Aq. susp.	350	–	–	9–16 d
Hydroxyprogest. caproate	Oil soln.	250–500 (Note: In divided doses (2 × 125 or 250 mg for OHPC, 10 × 20 mg for P4).)	–	250–500	5–21 d
Medroxyprog. acetate	Aq. susp.	50–100	150	25	14–50+ d
Megestrol acetate	Aq. susp.	–	–	25	>14 d
Norethisterone enanthate	Oil soln.	100–200	200	50	11–52 d
Progesterone	Oil soln.	200	–	–	2–6 d
Progesterone	Aq. soln.	?	–	–	1–2 d
Progesterone	Aq. susp.	50–200	–	–	7–14 d
Notes and sources:

==== Antigonadotropic effects ====
Progestogens, similarly to the androgens and estrogens through their own respective receptors, inhibit the secretion of the gonadotropins follicle-stimulating hormone (FSH) and luteinizing hormone (LH) via activation of the PR in the pituitary gland. This effect is a form of negative feedback on the hypothalamic–pituitary–gonadal axis (HPG axis) and takes advantage of the mechanism that the body uses to prevent sex hormone levels from becoming too high. Accordingly, progestogens, both endogenous and exogenous (i.e., progestins), have antigonadotropic effects, and progestogens in sufficiently high amounts can markedly suppress the body's normal production of progestogens, androgens, and estrogens as well as inhibit fertility (ovulation in women and spermatogenesis in men).

Progestogens have been found to maximally suppress circulating testosterone levels in men by up to 70 to 80% at sufficiently high doses. This is notably less than that achieved by GnRH analogues, which can effectively abolish gonadal production of testosterone and suppress circulating testosterone levels by as much as 95%. It is also less than that achieved by high-dose estrogen therapy, which can suppress testosterone levels into the castrate range similarly to GnRH analogues.

The retroprogesterone derivatives dydrogesterone and trengestone are atypical progestogens and unlike all other clinically used progestogens do not have antigonadotropic effects nor inhibit ovulation even at very high doses. In fact, trengestone may have progonadotropic effects, and is actually able to induce ovulation, with about a 50% success rate on average. These progestins also show other atypical properties relative to other progestogens, such as a lack of a hyperthermic effect.

==== Androgenic activity ====
Some progestins have androgenic activity and can produce androgenic side effects such as increased sebum production (oilier skin), acne, and hirsutism (excessive facial/body hair growth), as well as changes in liver protein production. Only certain progestins are androgenic however, these being the testosterone derivatives and, to a lesser extent, the 17α-hydroxyprogesterone derivatives medroxyprogesterone acetate and megestrol acetate. No other progestins have such activity (though some, conversely, possess antiandrogenic activity). Moreover, the androgenic activity of progestins within the testosterone derivatives also varies, and while some may have high or moderate androgenic activity, others have only low or no such activity.

The androgenic activity of androgenic progestins is mediated by two mechanisms: 1) direct binding to and activation of the androgen receptor; and 2) displacement of testosterone from sex hormone-binding globulin (SHBG), thereby increasing free (and thus bioactive) testosterone levels. The androgenic activity of many androgenic progestins is offset by combination with ethinylestradiol, which robustly increases SHBG levels, and most oral contraceptives in fact markedly reduce free testosterone levels and can treat or improve acne and hirsutism. An exception is progestin-only contraceptives, which do not also contain an estrogen.

The relative androgenic activity of testosterone-derivative progestins and other progestins that have androgenic activity can be roughly ranked as follows:

- Very high: danazol, ethisterone, gestrinone, normethandrone, norvinisterone
- High: levonorgestrel, norgestrel, norgestrienone, tibolone
- Moderate: norethisterone and its prodrugs (norethisterone acetate, norethisterone enanthate, etynodiol diacetate, lynestrenol, quingestanol acetate)
- Low: desogestrel, etonogestrel, gestodene, norgestimate
- Very low or negligible: allylestrenol, dimethisterone, medroxyprogesterone acetate, megestrol acetate, norelgestromin, noretynodrel, norgesterone
- Antiandrogenic: dienogest, oxendolone

The clinical androgenic and anabolic activity of the androgenic progestins listed above is still far lower than that of conventional androgens and anabolic steroids like testosterone and nandrolone esters. As such, they are only generally associated with such effects in women and often only at high doses. In men, due to their concomitant progestogenic activity and by extension antigonadotropic effects, these progestins can have potent functional antiandrogenic effects via suppression of testosterone production and levels.

==== Antiandrogenic activity ====
Some progestogens have antiandrogenic activity in addition to their progestogenic activity. These progestogens, with varying degrees of potency as antiandrogens, include chlormadinone acetate, cyproterone acetate, dienogest, drospirenone, medrogestone, megestrol acetate, nomegestrol acetate, osaterone acetate (veterinary), and oxendolone. The relative antiandrogenic activity in animals of some of these progestogens has been ranked as follows: cyproterone acetate (100%) > nomegestrol acetate (90%) > dienogest (30–40%) ≥ chlormadinone acetate (30%) = drospirenone (30%). Antiandrogenic activity in certain progestogens may help to improve symptoms of acne, seborrhea, hirsutism, and other androgen-dependent conditions in women.

==== Estrogenic activity ====
A few progestins have weak estrogenic activity. These include the 19-nortestosterone derivatives norethisterone, noretynodrel, and tibolone, as well as the norethisterone prodrugs norethisterone acetate, norethisterone enanthate, lynestrenol, and etynodiol diacetate. The estrogenic activity of norethisterone and its prodrugs are due to metabolism into ethinylestradiol. High doses of norethisterone and noretynodrel have been associated with estrogenic side effects such as breast enlargement in women and gynecomastia in men, but also with alleviation of menopausal symptoms in postmenopausal women. In contrast, non-estrogenic progestins were not found to be associated with such effects.

==== Glucocorticoid activity ====
Some progestogens, mainly certain 17α-hydroxyprogesterone derivatives, have weak glucocorticoid activity. This can result, at sufficiently high doses, in side effects such as symptoms of Cushing's syndrome, steroid diabetes, adrenal suppression and insufficiency, and neuropsychiatric symptoms like depression, anxiety, irritability, and cognitive impairment. Progestogens with the potential for clinically relevant glucocorticoid effects include the 17α-hydroxyprogesterone derivatives chlormadinone acetate, cyproterone acetate, medroxyprogesterone acetate, megestrol acetate, promegestone, and segesterone acetate and the testosterone derivatives desogestrel, etonogestrel, and gestodene. Conversely, hydroxyprogesterone caproate possesses no such activity, while progesterone itself has very weak glucocorticoid activity.

Glucocorticoid activity of selected steroids in vitro
Steroid	Class	TR (↑)^{a}	GR (%)^{b}
Dexamethasone	Corticosteroid	++	100
Ethinylestradiol	Estrogen	–	0
Etonogestrel	Progestin	+	14
Gestodene	Progestin	+	27
Levonorgestrel	Progestin	–	1
Medroxyprogesterone acetate	Progestin	+	29
Norethisterone	Progestin	–	0
Norgestimate	Progestin	–	1
Progesterone	Progestogen	+	10
Footnotes: ^{a} = Thrombin receptor (TR) upregulation (↑) in vascular smooth muscle cells (VSMCs). ^{b} = RBA (%) for the glucocorticoid receptor (GR). Strength: – = No effect. + = Pronounced effect. ++ = Strong effect. Sources:

==== Antimineralocorticoid activity ====
Certain progestogens, including progesterone, drospirenone, and gestodene, as well as to a lesser extent dydrogesterone and trimegestone, have varying degrees of antimineralocorticoid activity. Other progestins might also have significant antimineralocorticoid activity. Progesterone itself has potent antimineralocorticoid activity. No clinically used progestogens are known to have mineralocorticoid activity.

Progestins with potent antimineralocorticoid activity like drospirenone may have properties more similar to those of natural progesterone, such as counteraction of cyclical estrogen-induced sodium and fluid retention, edema, and associated weight gain; lowered blood pressure; and possibly improved cardiovascular health.

==== Neurosteroid activity ====
Progesterone has neurosteroid activity via metabolism into allopregnanolone and pregnanolone, potent positive allosteric modulators of the GABA_{A} receptor. As a result, it has associated effects such as sedation, somnolence, and cognitive impairment. No progestin is known to have similar such neurosteroid activity or effects. However, promegestone has been found to act as a non-competitive antagonist of the nicotinic acetylcholine receptor similarly to progesterone.

==== Other activities ====
Certain progestins have been found to stimulate the proliferation of MCF-7 breast cancer cells in vitro, an action that is independent of the classical PRs and is instead mediated via the progesterone receptor membrane component-1 (PGRMC1). Norethisterone, desogestrel, levonorgestrel, and drospirenone strongly stimulate proliferation and medroxyprogesterone acetate, dienogest, and dydrogesterone weakly stimulate proliferation, whereas progesterone, nomegestrol acetate, and chlormadinone acetate act neutrally in the assay and do not stimulate proliferation. It is unclear whether these findings may explain the different risks of breast cancer observed with progesterone, dydrogesterone, and other progestins such as medroxyprogesterone acetate and norethisterone in clinical studies.

=== Pharmacokinetics ===
Oral progesterone has very low bioavailability and potency. Micronization and dissolution in oil-filled capsules, a formulation known as oral micronized progesterone (OMP), increases the bioavailability of progesterone by several-fold. However, the bioavailability of oral micronized progesterone nonetheless remains very low at less than 2.4%. Progesterone also has a very short elimination half-life in the circulation of no more than 1.5 hours. Due to the poor oral activity of oral micronized progesterone, it has relatively weak progestogenic effects. Administration of progesterone in oil solution by intramuscular injection has a duration of about 2 or 3 days, necessitating frequent injections. Transdermal administration of progesterone in the form of creams or gels achieves only very low levels of progesterone and weak progestogenic effects.

Due to the poor oral activity of progesterone and its short duration with intramuscular injection, progestins were developed in its place both for oral use and for parenteral administration. Orally active progestins have high oral bioavailability in comparison to oral micronized progesterone. Their bioavailability is generally in the range of 60 to 100%. Their elimination half-lives are also much longer than that of progesterone, in the range of 8 to 80 hours. Due mainly to their pharmacokinetic improvements, progestins have oral potency that is up to several orders of magnitude greater than that of oral micronized progesterone. For example, the oral potency of medroxyprogesterone acetate is at least 30-fold that of oral micronized progesterone, while the oral potency of gestodene is at least 10,000-fold that of oral micronized progesterone. Parenterally administered progestins, such as hydroxyprogesterone caproate in oil solution, norethisterone enanthate in oil solution, and medroxyprogesterone acetate in microcrystalline aqueous suspension, have durations in the range of weeks to months.

Pharmacokinetics of progestogens
Progestogen	Class	Dose^{a}	Bioavailability	Half-life
Allylestrenol	Estrane	NA	?	Prodrug
Chlormadinone acetate	Pregnane	2 mg	~100%	80 hours
Cyproterone acetate	Pregnane	2 mg	~100%	54–79 hours
Desogestrel	Gonane	0.15 mg	63%	Prodrug
Dienogest	Gonane	4 mg	96%	11–12 hours
Drospirenone	Spirolactone	3 mg	66%	31–33 hours
Dydrogesterone	Pregnane	10 mg	28%	14–17 hours
Etynodiol diacetate	Estrane	NA	?	Prodrug
Gestodene	Gonane	0.075 mg	88–99%	12–14 hours
Hydroxyprogesterone caproate	Pregnane	ND	–	8 days^{b}
Levonorgestrel	Gonane	0.15–0.25 mg	90%	10–13 hours
Lynestrenol	Estrane	NA	?	Prodrug
Medrogestone	Pregnane	5 mg	~100%	35 hours
Medroxyprogesterone acetate	Pregnane	10 mg	~100%	24 hours
Megestrol acetate	Pregnane	160 mg	~100%	22 hours
Nomegestrol acetate	Pregnane	2.5 mg	60%	50 hours
Norethisterone	Estrane	1 mg	64%	8 hours
Norethisterone acetate	Estrane	NA	?	Prodrug
Noretynodrel	Estrane	NA	?	Prodrug
Norgestimate	Gonane	NA	?	Prodrug
Progesterone (micronized)	Pregnane	100–200 mg	<2.4%	5 hours
Promegestone	Pregnane	NA	?	Prodrug
Tibolone	Estrane	NA	?	Prodrug
Trimegestone	Pregnane	0.5 mg	~100%	15 hours
Notes: All by oral administration, unless otherwise noted. Footnotes: ^{a} = For the listed pharmacokinetic values. ^{b} = By intramuscular injection. Sources: See template.

== Chemistry ==
All currently available progestogens are steroidal in terms of chemical structure. Progestogens include the naturally occurring progesterone and the synthetic progestogens (otherwise known as progestins). Progestins can be broadly grouped into two structural classes—chemical derivatives of progesterone and chemical derivatives of testosterone. Progesterone derivatives can be classified into subgroups including pregnanes, retropregnanes, norpregnanes, and spirolactones. Examples of progestins of each of these subgroups include medroxyprogesterone acetate, dydrogesterone, nomegestrol acetate, and drospirenone, respectively. Testosterone derivatives can be classified into subgroups including androstanes, estranes (19-norandrostanes), and gonanes (18-methylestranes). Examples of progestins of each of these subgroups include ethisterone, norethisterone, and levonorgestrel, respectively. Many progestins have ester and/or ether substitutions (see progestogen ester) which result in greater lipophilicity and in some cases cause the progestins in question to act as prodrugs in the body.

Structural aspects of progestogens used in clinical and veterinary medicine
Class	Subclass	Progestogen	Structure	Chemical name	Features
Pregnane	Progesterone	Progesterone		Pregn-4-ene-3,20-dione	–
Pregnane	Progesterone	Quingestrone		Progesterone 3-cyclopentyl enol ether	Ether
Pregnane	17α-Hydroxyprogesterone	Acetomepregenol		3-Deketo-3β,17α-dihydroxy-6-dehydro-6-methylprogesterone 3β,17α-diacetate	Ester
Pregnane	17α-Hydroxyprogesterone	Algestone acetophenide		16α,17α-Dihydroxyprogesterone 16α,17α-(cyclic acetal with acetophenone)	Cyclic acetal
Pregnane	17α-Hydroxyprogesterone	Anagestone acetate		3-Deketo-6α-methyl-17α-hydroxyprogesterone 17α-acetate	Ester
Pregnane	17α-Hydroxyprogesterone	Chlormadinone acetate		6-Dehydro-6-chloro-17α-hydroxyprogesterone 17α-acetate	Ester
Pregnane	17α-Hydroxyprogesterone	Chlormethenmadinone acetate		6-Dehydro-6-chloro-16-methylene-17α-hydroxyprogesterone 17α-acetate	Ester
Pregnane	17α-Hydroxyprogesterone	Cyproterone acetate		1,2α-Methylene-6-dehydro-6-chloro-17α-hydroxyprogesterone 17α-acetate	Ester; Ring-fused
Pregnane	17α-Hydroxyprogesterone	Delmadinone acetate		1,6-Didehydro-6-chloro-17α-hydroxyprogesterone 17α-acetate	Ester
Pregnane	17α-Hydroxyprogesterone	Flugestone acetate		9α-Fluoro-11β,17α-dihydroxyprogesterone 17α-acetate	Ester
Pregnane	17α-Hydroxyprogesterone	Flumedroxone acetate		6α-(Trifluoromethyl)-17α-hydroxyprogesterone 17α-acetate	Ester
Pregnane	17α-Hydroxyprogesterone	Hydroxyprogesterone acetate		17α-Hydroxyprogesterone 17α-acetate	Ester
Pregnane	17α-Hydroxyprogesterone	Hydroxyprogesterone caproate		17α-Hydroxyprogesterone 17α-hexanoate	Ester
Pregnane	17α-Hydroxyprogesterone	Hydroxyprogesterone heptanoate		17α-Hydroxyprogesterone 17α-heptanoate	Ester
Pregnane	17α-Hydroxyprogesterone	Medroxyprogesterone acetate		6α-Methyl-17α-hydroxyprogesterone 17α-acetate	Ester
Pregnane	17α-Hydroxyprogesterone	Megestrol acetate		6-Dehydro-6-methyl-17α-hydroxyprogesterone 17α-acetate	Ester
Pregnane	17α-Hydroxyprogesterone	Melengestrol acetate		6-Dehydro-6-methyl-16-methylene-17α-hydroxyprogesterone 17α-acetate	Ester
Pregnane	17α-Hydroxyprogesterone	Methenmadinone acetate		6-Dehydro-16-methylene-17α-hydroxyprogesterone 17α-acetate	Ester
Pregnane	17α-Hydroxyprogesterone	Osaterone acetate		2-Oxa-6-dehydro-6-chloro-17α-hydroxyprogesterone 17α-acetate	Ester
Pregnane	17α-Hydroxyprogesterone	Pentagestrone acetate		17α-Hydroxyprogesterone 3-cyclopentyl enol ether 17α-acetate	Ester; Ether
Pregnane	17α-Hydroxyprogesterone	Proligestone		14α,17α-Dihydroxyprogesterone 14α,17α-(cyclic acetal with propionaldehyde)	Cyclic acetal
Pregnane	Other 17α-substituted progesterone	Haloprogesterone		6α-Fluoro-17α-bromoprogesterone	–
Pregnane	Other 17α-substituted progesterone	Medrogestone		6-Dehydro-6,17α-dimethylprogesterone	–
Pregnane	Spirolactone	Drospirenone		6β,7β:15β,16β-Dimethylenespirolactone	Ring-fused
Norpregnane	19-Norprogesterone; 17α-Hydroxyprogesterone	Gestonorone caproate		17α-Hydroxy-19-norprogesterone 17α-hexanoate	Ester
Norpregnane	19-Norprogesterone; 17α-Hydroxyprogesterone	Nomegestrol acetate		6-Dehydro-6-methyl-17α-hydroxy-19-norprogesterone 17α-acetate	Ester
Norpregnane	19-Norprogesterone; 17α-Hydroxyprogesterone	Norgestomet		11β-Methyl-17α-hydroxy-19-norprogesterone 17α-acetate	Ester
Norpregnane	19-Norprogesterone; 17α-Hydroxyprogesterone	Segesterone acetate		16-Methylene-17α-hydroxy-19-norprogesterone 17α-acetate	Ester
Norpregnane	19-Norprogesterone; Other 17α-substituted progesterone	Demegestone		9-Dehydro-17α-methyl-19-norprogesterone	–
Norpregnane	19-Norprogesterone; Other 17α-substituted progesterone	Promegestone		9-Dehydro-17α,21-dimethyl-19-norprogesterone	–
Norpregnane	19-Norprogesterone; Other 17α-substituted progesterone	Trimegestone		9-Dehydro-17α,21-dimethyl-19-nor-21β-hydroxyprogesterone	–
Retropregnane	Retroprogesterone	Dydrogesterone		6-Dehydro-9β,10α-progesterone	–
Retropregnane	Retroprogesterone	Trengestone		1,6-Didehydro-6-chloro-9β,10α-progesterone	–
Androstane	17α-Ethynyltestosterone	Danazol		2,3-d-Isoxazol-17α-ethynyltestosterone	Ring-fused
Androstane	17α-Ethynyltestosterone	Dimethisterone		6α,21-Dimethyl-17α-ethynyltestosterone	–
Androstane	17α-Ethynyltestosterone	Ethisterone		17α-Ethynyltestosterone	–
Estrane	19-Nortestosterone; 17α-Ethynyltestosterone	Etynodiol diacetate		3-Deketo-3β-hydroxy-17α-ethynyl-19-nortestosterone 3β,17β-diacetate	Ester
Estrane	19-Nortestosterone; 17α-Ethynyltestosterone	Lynestrenol		3-Deketo-17α-ethynyl-19-nortestosterone	–
Estrane	19-Nortestosterone; 17α-Ethynyltestosterone	Norethisterone		17α-Ethynyl-19-nortestosterone	–
Estrane	19-Nortestosterone; 17α-Ethynyltestosterone	Norethisterone acetate		17α-Ethynyl-19-nortestosterone 17β-acetate	Ester
Estrane	19-Nortestosterone; 17α-Ethynyltestosterone	Norethisterone enanthate		17α-Ethynyl-19-nortestosterone 17β-heptanoate	Ester
Estrane	19-Nortestosterone; 17α-Ethynyltestosterone	Noretynodrel		5(10)-Dehydro-17α-ethynyl-19-nortestosterone	–
Estrane	19-Nortestosterone; 17α-Ethynyltestosterone	Norgestrienone		9,11-Didehydro-17α-ethynyl-19-nortestosterone	–
Estrane	19-Nortestosterone; 17α-Ethynyltestosterone	Quingestanol acetate		17α-Ethynyl-19-nortestosterone 3-cyclopentyl enol ether 17β-acetate	Ester; Ether
Estrane	19-Nortestosterone; 17α-Ethynyltestosterone	Tibolone		5(10)-Dehydro-7α-methyl-17α-ethynyl-19-nortestosterone	–
Estrane	19-Nortestosterone; Other 17α-substituted testosterone (and 16β-substituted testosterone)	Allylestrenol		3-Deketo-17α-allyl-19-nortestosterone	–
Estrane	19-Nortestosterone; Other 17α-substituted testosterone (and 16β-substituted testosterone)	Altrenogest		9,11-Didehydro-17α-allyl-19-nortestosterone	–
Estrane	19-Nortestosterone; Other 17α-substituted testosterone (and 16β-substituted testosterone)	Dienogest		9-Dehydro-17α-cyanomethyl-19-nortestosterone	–
Estrane	19-Nortestosterone; Other 17α-substituted testosterone (and 16β-substituted testosterone)	Norgesterone		5(10)-Dehydro-17α-vinyl-19-nortestosterone	–
Estrane	19-Nortestosterone; Other 17α-substituted testosterone (and 16β-substituted testosterone)	Normethandrone		17α-Methyl-19-nortestosterone	–
Estrane	19-Nortestosterone; Other 17α-substituted testosterone (and 16β-substituted testosterone)	Norvinisterone		17α-Vinyl-19-nortestosterone	–
Estrane	19-Nortestosterone; Other 17α-substituted testosterone (and 16β-substituted testosterone)	Oxendolone		16β-Ethyl-19-nortestosterone	–
Gonane	19-Nortestosterone; 17α-Ethynyltestosterone; 18-Methyltestosterone	Desogestrel		3-Deketo-11-methylene-17α-ethynyl-18-methyl-19-nortestosterone	–
Gonane	19-Nortestosterone; 17α-Ethynyltestosterone; 18-Methyltestosterone	Etonogestrel		11-Methylene-17α-ethynyl-18-methyl-19-nortestosterone	–
Gonane	19-Nortestosterone; 17α-Ethynyltestosterone; 18-Methyltestosterone	Gestodene		15-Dehydro-17α-ethynyl-18-methyl-19-nortestosterone	–
Gonane	19-Nortestosterone; 17α-Ethynyltestosterone; 18-Methyltestosterone	Gestrinone		9,11-Didehydro-17α-ethynyl-18-methyl-19-nortestosterone	–
Gonane	19-Nortestosterone; 17α-Ethynyltestosterone; 18-Methyltestosterone	Levonorgestrel		17α-Ethynyl-18-methyl-19-nortestosterone	–
Gonane	19-Nortestosterone; 17α-Ethynyltestosterone; 18-Methyltestosterone	Norelgestromin		17α-Ethynyl-18-methyl-19-nortestosterone 3-oxime	Oxime
Gonane	19-Nortestosterone; 17α-Ethynyltestosterone; 18-Methyltestosterone	Norgestimate		17α-Ethynyl-18-methyl-19-nortestosterone 3-oxime 17β-acetate	Oxime; Ester
Gonane	19-Nortestosterone; 17α-Ethynyltestosterone; 18-Methyltestosterone	Norgestrel		rac-13-Ethyl-17α-ethynyl-19-nortestosterone	–

== History ==
Historical progestogens no longer marketed for use
Generic name	Class (Note: Classes: P = progesterone derivative, T = testosterone derivative)	Brand name	Route (Note: Routes: IUD = intrauterine device, PO = by mouth, SC = subcutaneous injection or implant, SL = under the tongue, TD = transdermal, V = vaginal)	Intr.
Anagestone acetate	P (Note: 17α-hydroxy) (Note: Ester)	Anatropin	PO	1968
Chlormethenmadinone acetate	P	Biogest (Note: Also marketed under other brand names.)	PO	1960s
Demegestone	P (Note: 19-nor)	Lutionex	PO	1974
Dimethisterone	T (Note: estrane)	Lutagan	PO	1959
Ethisterone	T	Pranone	PO, SL	1939
Flumedroxone acetate	P	Demigran	PO	1960s
Haloprogesterone	P (Note: 17-bromo)	Prohalone	PO	1961
Hydroxyprogesterone acetate	P	Prodox	PO	1957
Hydroxyprogesterone heptanoate	P	H.O.P.	IM	1950s
Methenmadinone acetate	P	Superlutin	PO	1960s
Noretynodrel	T (Note: 19-nor)	Enovid	PO	1957
Norgesterone	T	Vestalin	PO	1960s
Norgestrienone	T	Ogyline	PO	1960s
Norvinisterone	T	Neoprogestin	PO	1960s
Pentagestrone acetate	P	Gestovis	PO	1961
Quingestanol acetate	T (Note: Gonane) (Note: ether)	Demovis	PO	1972
Quingestrone	P	Enol-Luteovis	PO	1962
Trengestone	RP	Retrone	PO	1974
Legend for class of molecule

The recognition of progesterone's ability to suppress ovulation during pregnancy spawned a search for a similar hormone that could bypass the problems associated with administering progesterone (e.g. low bioavailability when administered orally and local irritation and pain when continually administered parenterally) and, at the same time, serve the purpose of controlling ovulation. The many synthetic hormones that resulted are known as progestins.

The first orally active progestin, ethisterone (pregneninolone, 17α-ethynyltestosterone), the C17α ethynyl analogue of testosterone, was synthesized in 1938 from dehydroandrosterone by ethynylation, either before or after oxidation of the C3 hydroxyl group, followed by rearrangement of the C5(6) double bond to the C4(5) position. The synthesis was designed by chemists Hans Herloff Inhoffen, Willy Logemann, Walter Hohlweg and Arthur Serini at Schering AG in Berlin and was marketed in Germany in 1939 as Proluton C and by Schering in the U.S. in 1945 as Pranone.

A more potent orally active progestin, norethisterone (norethindrone, 19-nor-17α-ethynyltestosterone), the C19 nor analogue of ethisterone, synthesized in 1951 by Carl Djerassi, Luis Miramontes, and George Rosenkranz at Syntex in Mexico City, was marketed by Parke-Davis in the U.S. in 1957 as Norlutin, and was used as the progestin in some of the first oral contraceptives (Ortho-Novum, Norinyl, etc.) in the early 1960s.

Noretynodrel, an isomer of norethisterone, was synthesized in 1952 by Frank B. Colton at Searle in Skokie, Illinois and used as the progestin in Enovid, marketed in the U.S. in 1957 and approved as the first oral contraceptive in 1960.

== Society and culture ==
=== Generations ===
Progestins used in birth control are sometimes grouped, somewhat arbitrarily and inconsistently, into generations. One categorization of these generations is as follows:

- First generation: Approved for marketing before 1973. Examples: noretynodrel, norethisterone (norethindrone), lynestrenol, levonorgestrel.
- Second generation: Approved for marketing between 1973 and 1989. Examples: desogestrel, nomegestrol acetate, norgestimate.
- Third generation: Approved for marketing between 1990 and 2000. Examples: dienogest, etonogestrel.
- Fourth generation: Approved for marketing after 2000. Examples: drospirenone, norelgestromin, segesterone acetate.

Alternatively, estranes such as noretynodrel and norethisterone are classified as first-generation while gonanes such as norgestrel and levonorgestrel are classified as second-generation, with less androgenic gonanes such as desogestrel, norgestimate, and gestodene classified as third-generation and newer progestins like drospirenone classified as fourth-generation. Yet another classification system considers there to be only first- and second-generation progestins.

Classification of progestins by generation has been criticized and it has been argued that the classification scheme should be abandoned.

=== Availability ===
Progestogens are available widely throughout the world in many different forms. They are present in all birth control pills.

=== Etymology ===
Progestogens, also termed progestagens, progestogens, or gestagens, are compounds which act as agonists of the progesterone receptors. Progestogens include progesterone—which is the main natural and endogenous progestogen—and progestins, which are synthetic progestogens. Progestins include the 17α-hydroxyprogesterone derivative medroxyprogesterone acetate and the 19-nortestosterone derivative norethisterone, among many other synthetic progestogens. As progesterone is a single compound and has no plural form, the term "progesterones" does not exist and is grammatically incorrect. The terms describing progestogens are often confused. However, progestogens have differing activities and effects and it is inappropriate to interchange them.

== Research ==
A variety of progestins have been studied for use as potential male hormonal contraceptives in combination with androgens in men. These include the pregnanes medroxyprogesterone acetate, megestrol acetate, and cyproterone acetate, the norpregnane segesterone acetate, and the estranes norethisterone acetate, norethisterone enanthate, levonorgestrel, levonorgestrel butanoate, desogestrel, and etonogestrel. The androgens that have been used in combination with these progestins include testosterone, testosterone esters, androstanolone (dihydrotestosterone), and nandrolone esters. Dual androgens and progestogens such as trestolone and dimethandrolone undecanoate have also been developed and studied as male contraceptives. Doses of progestins used in male hormonal contraception have been noted to be in the range of 5 to 12 times the doses used in female hormonal contraception.

== See also ==
- Phytoprogestogen
- Antiprogestogen
- Selective progesterone receptor modulator
