= Norgestomet =

Chemical compound

Clinical data
- Trade names: Syncro-Mate B, Crestar
- Other names: Norgestamet; SC-21009; 11β-Methyl-17α-acetoxy-19-norprogesterone; 17α-Hydroxy-11β-methyl-19-norpregn-4-ene-3,20-dione acetate
- Drug class: Progestogen; Progestin; Progestogen ester

Identifiers
- IUPAC name: [(8R,9S,10R,11S,13S,14S,17R)-17-acetyl-11,13-dimethyl-3-oxo-1,2,6,7,8,9,10,11,12,14,15,16-dodecahydrocyclopenta[a]phenanthren-17-yl] acetate
- CAS Number: 25092-41-5
- PubChem CID: 9820838
- ChemSpider: 7996587
- UNII: 3L33UD42X4
- CompTox Dashboard (EPA): DTXSID901016491
- ECHA InfoCard: 100.042.359

Chemical and physical data
- Formula: C_{23}H_{32}O_{4}
- Molar mass: 372.505 g·mol^{−1}
- 3D model (JSmol): Interactive image
- SMILES: CC1CC2(C(CCC2(C(=O)C)OC(=O)C)C3C1C4CCC(=O)C=C4CC3)C
- InChI: InChI=1S/C23H32O4/c1-13-12-22(4)20(9-10-23(22,14(2)24)27-15(3)25)19-7-5-16-11-17(26)6-8-18(16)21(13)19/h11,13,18-21H,5-10,12H2,1-4H3/t13-,18-,19-,20-,21+,22-,23-/m0/s1; Key:IWSXBCZCPVUWHT-VIFKTUCRSA-N

Norgestomet, or norgestamet, sold under the brand name Syncro-Mate B and Crestar, is a progestin medication which is used in veterinary medicine to control estrus and ovulation in cattle.

== Uses ==
=== Veterinary ===
Norgestomet is used in veterinary medicine.

== Pharmacology ==
=== Pharmacodynamics ===
Norgestomet is a progestogen. In addition to the progesterone receptor, it possesses weak (micromolar) affinity for the glucocorticoid receptor.

== Chemistry ==
Norgestomet, also known as 11β-methyl-17α-acetoxy-19-norprogesterone or as 17α-hydroxy-11β-methyl-19-norpregn-4-ene-3,20-dione acetate, is a synthetic norpregnane steroid and a derivative of progesterone.

== History ==
Norgestomet was developed and introduced for veterinary use in the mid-1970s.

== Society and culture ==
=== Generic names ===
Norgestomet is the generic name of the drug and its INN, USAN, and BAN. It also known as norgestamet and is known by its developmental code name SC-21009.

=== Brand names ===
Norgestomet is marketed under the brand names Syncro-Mate B and Crestar.
