= Gonane =

Tetracyclic hydrocarbon parent of the steroids

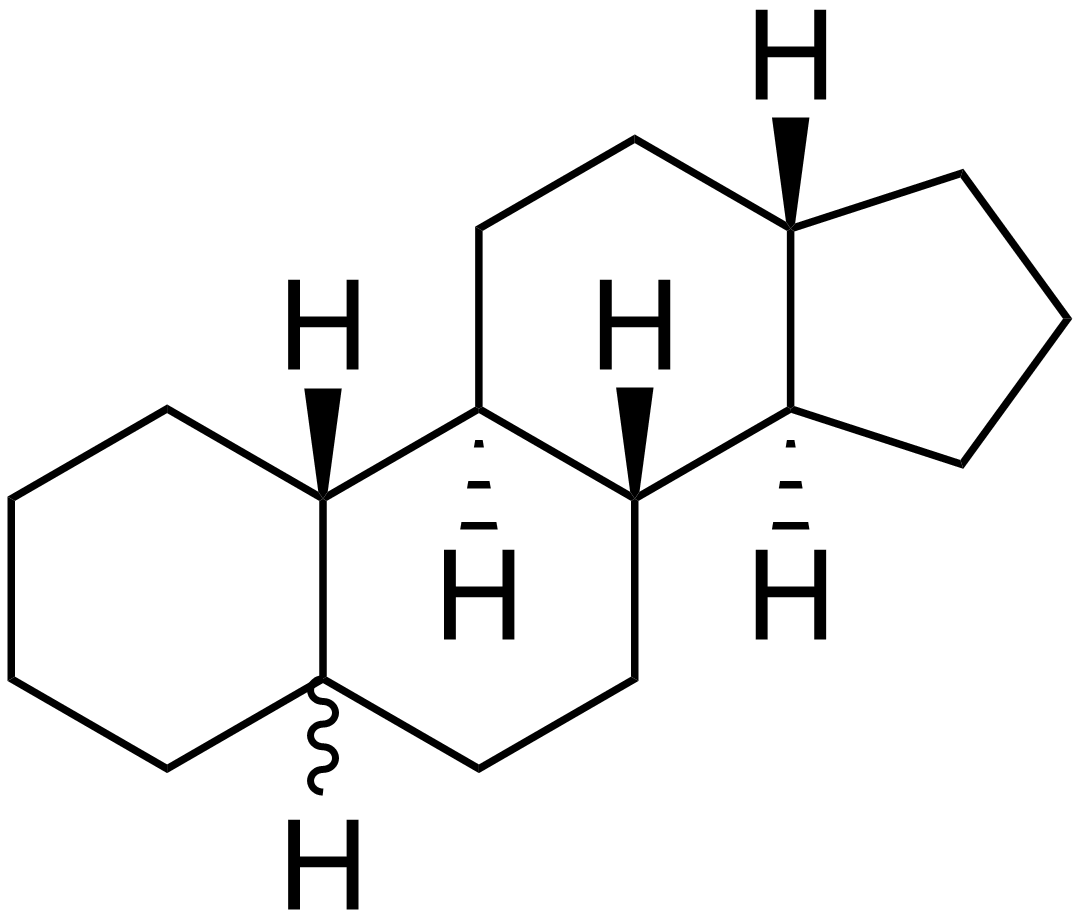
- Stereo, skeletal formula of gonane ((1R,2S,10S,11R,15S)-heptadecane) with all chiral centres hydrogenised

- Carbon numbering in gonane

Names
- IUPAC name 5ξ-Gonane
- Systematic IUPAC name (3aR,3bS,5aΞ,9aS,9bR,11aS)-Hexadecahydro-1H-cyclopenta[a]phenanthrene

Identifiers
CAS Number	4732-76-7 (1R,2S,10S,11R,15S)- heptadecane
3D model (JSmol)	Interactive image
ChEBI	CHEBI:35528
ChemSpider	5256859 (1R,2S,10S,11R,15S)- heptadecane; 5256861 (1R,2S,7R,10S,11R,15S)- heptadecane; 5256860 (1R,2S,7S,10S,11R,15S)- heptadecane; 1077
KEGG	C19639
PubChem CID	1108; 6857523 (1R,2S,10S,11R,15S)- heptadecane; 6857525 (1R,2S,7R,10S,11R,15S)- heptadecane; 6857524 (1R,2S,7S,10S,11R,15S)- heptadecane
CompTox Dashboard (EPA)	DTXSID00425895
- InChI: InChI=1S/C17H28/c1-2-6-14-12(4-1)8-10-17-15-7-3-5-13(15)9-11-16(14)17/h12-17H,1-11H2/t12?,13-,14-,15+,16+,17-/m0/s1 Key: UACIBCPNAKBWHX-CTBOZYAPSA-N
- SMILES: C2C1[C@H](CCCC1)[C@H]3CC[C@H]4[C@H]([C@@H]3C2)CCC4

Properties
Chemical formula	C_{17}H_{28}
Molar mass	232.411 g·mol^{−1}
- Except where otherwise noted, data are given for materials in their standard state (at 25 °C [77 °F], 100 kPa). verify (what is ?) Infobox references

Gonane (cyclopentanoperhydrophenanthrene) is a chemical compound with formula C_{17}H_{28}, whose structure consists of four hydrocarbon rings fused together: three cyclohexane units and one cyclopentane. It can also be viewed as the result of fusing a cyclopentane molecule with a fully hydrogenated molecule of phenanthrene, hence the more descriptive name "perhydrocyclopenta[a]phenanthrene". The non-systematic version of the above name is "cyclopentanoperhydrophenanthrene".

It has no double bonds, that is, it is completely saturated and is considered the main structure of steroids, often referred to as the steroid nucleus. There are many forms of gonane, but only a few occur naturally in living organisms. Some common forms include 5α-gonane and 5β-gonane. Estrane, androstane, and pregnane are derivatives of gonane with additional methyl or ethyl groups attached to certain carbon positions. The term gonane is also used to describe a group of progestins that are similar to levonorgestrel but have a slightly different structure than other hormones like estranes.

== Significance ==
Gonane is a significant chemical compound in the family of steroids because its structure comprises four hydrocarbon rings fused together, consisting of three cyclohexane units and one cyclopentane, which is often referred to as the "steroid nucleus" and serves as the parent compound for steroids.

The discovery of gonane and its role as a steroid nucleus has been fundamental in understanding the structure and function of various steroid hormones. The numbering of steroid rings is determined based on the skeletal structure of gonane, providing a framework for the classification and identification of different steroids.

== Usage of the term ==
The term gonane is also used to refer to a group of progestins that are carbon 18-homologated 19-nortestosterone derivatives including levonorgestrel and its analogues. This term is used in this way in order to distinguish them from estranes, which are also 19-nortestosterone derivatives.

== Structure ==
Gonane is a tetracyclic hydrocarbon with no double bonds. It is formally the parent compound of the steroids, hence it is called the "steroid nucleus". Some important gonane derivatives are the steroid hormones, characterized by methyl groups at the C10 and C13 positions and a side chain at the C17 position.

Because gonane has six centers of chirality, it has 64 (2^{6}) theoretically possible stereoisomers, that differ on the position of the lone hydrogens at carbons 5, 8, 9, 10, 13 and 14 in the direction perpendicular to the mean plane of the carbons. However, only a few of these stereoisomers occur in living organisms. The most common are 5α-gonane and 5β-gonane.

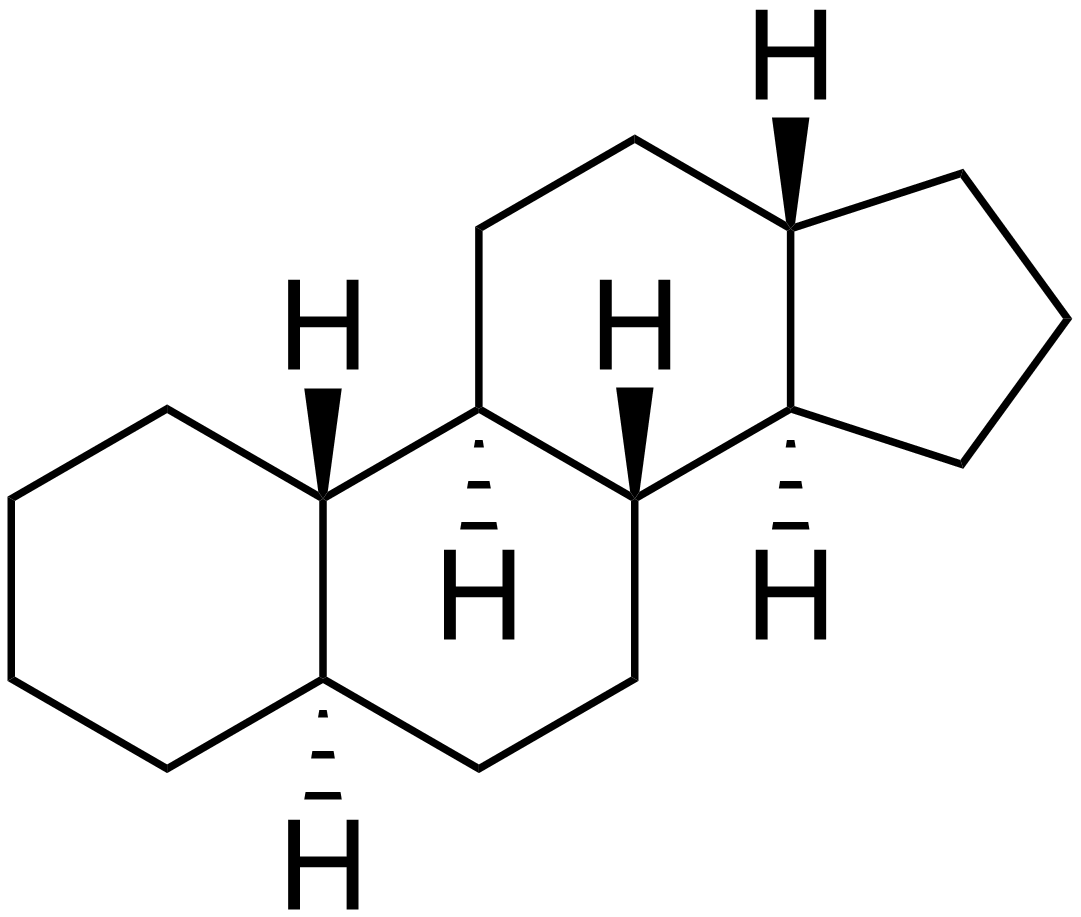
5α-Gonane

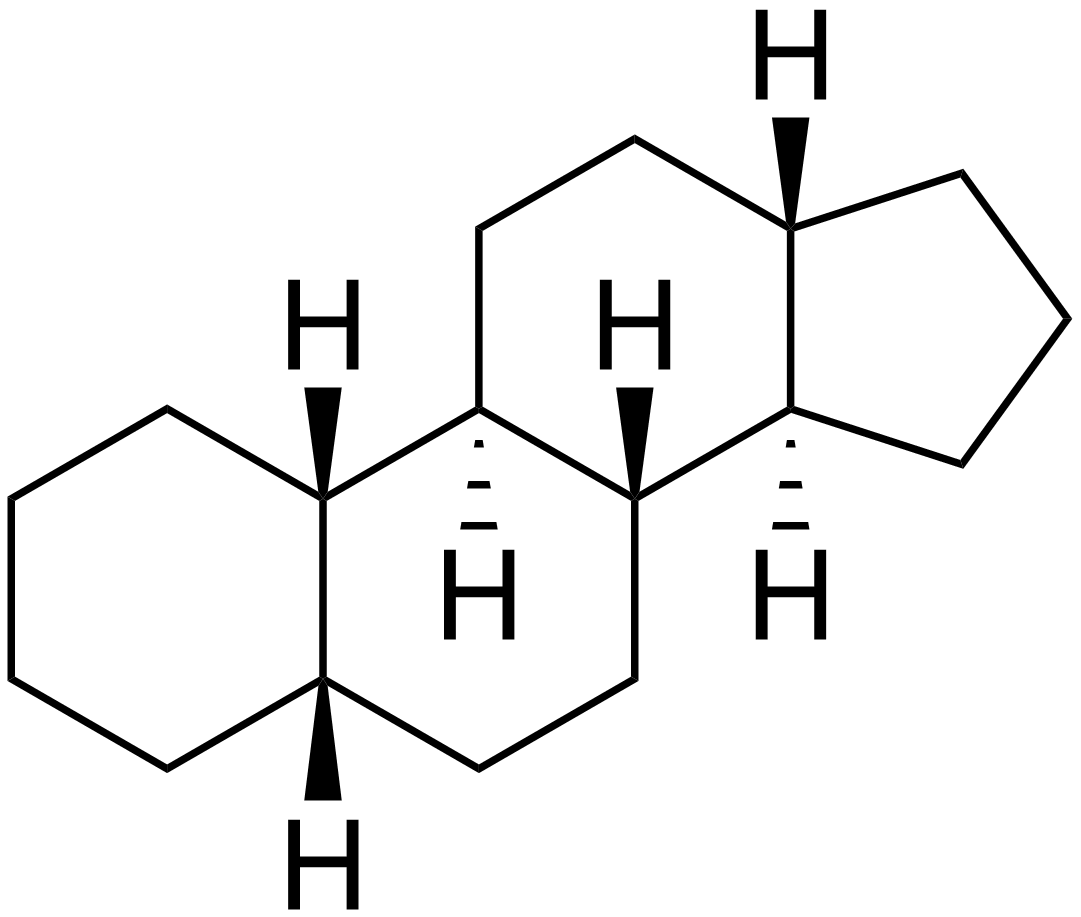
5β-Gonane
5α-Gonane, side-perspective view

5β-Gonane, side-perspective view

== Variants ==
Estrane (C18) is the 13β-methyl variant of gonane, androstane (C19) is the 10β,13β-dimethyl variant of gonane, and pregnane (C21) is the 10β,13β-dimethyl, 17β-ethyl variant of gonane.
