= 19-Norprogesterone =

Chemical compound

Clinical data
- Other names: 10-Norprogesterone; 19-Norpregn-4-ene-3,20-dione; 17β-Acetylestr-4-en-3-one
- Routes of administration: Parenteral
- Drug class: Progestin; Progestogen; Mineralocorticoid

Identifiers
- IUPAC name: (8R,9S,10R,13S,14S,17S)-17-acetyl-13-methyl-2,6,7,8,9,10,11,12,14,15,16,17-dodecahydro-1H-cyclopenta[a]phenanthren-3-one
- CAS Number: 472-54-8
- PubChem CID: 228864
- ChemSpider: 199224
- UNII: 1A5185976G
- CompTox Dashboard (EPA): DTXSID40197064

Chemical and physical data
- Formula: C_{20}H_{28}O_{2}
- Molar mass: 300.442 g·mol^{−1}
- 3D model (JSmol): Interactive image
- Melting point: 144 to 145 °C (291 to 293 °F)
- SMILES: O=C4\C=C2/[C@@H]([C@H]1CC[C@@]3([C@@H](C(=O)C)CC[C@H]3[C@@H]1CC2)C)CC4
- InChI: InChI=1S/C20H28O2/c1-12(21)18-7-8-19-17-5-3-13-11-14(22)4-6-15(13)16(17)9-10-20(18,19)2/h11,15-19H,3-10H2,1-2H3/t15-,16+,17+,18+,19-,20+/m0/s1; Key:NVUUMOOKVFONOM-GPBSYSOESA-N

19-Norprogesterone, also known as 19-norpregn-4-ene-3,20-dione, is a steroidal progestin and close analogue of the sex hormone progesterone, lacking only the C19 methyl group of that molecule. It was first synthesized in 1944 in the form of a mixture that also included unnatural stereoisomers (probably C14 (β) and C17 (α)) of progesterone, and this mixture was found to be at least equivalent to progesterone in terms of progestogenic activity. Subsequent investigations revealed that 17-isoprogesterone and 14-iso-17-isoprogesterone are devoid of progestogenic activity. 19-Norprogesterone was resynthesized in 1951 with an improved method, and was confirmed to be the component of the mixture synthesized in 1944 that was responsible for its progestogenic activity. In 1953, a paper was published showing that 19-norprogesterone possessed 4- to 8-fold the activity of progesterone in the Clauberg assay in rabbits, and at the time of this discovery, 19-norprogesterone was the most potent progestogen known.

Similarly to progesterone, 19-norprogesterone is a potent progestogen and possesses high affinity for the mineralocorticoid receptor (MR). However, unlike progesterone, which is an antagonist of the MR, 19-norprogesterone acts as a partial agonist of the MR and produces mineralocorticoid effects such as sodium retention, polydipsia, and hypertension in animals. Like progesterone, 19-norprogesterone is very active as a progestogen parenterally but is only minimally active orally. A SAR study found that 19-norprogesterone had 47% of the affinity of aldosterone for the rat MR and that 17α-hydroxylation (17α-hydroxy-19-norprogesterone, or gestronol) decreased it to 13%. The addition of 6-methylation with formation of a double bond at this position (nomegestrol) further decreased the MR affinity to 1.2% of that of aldosterone, and subsequent acetylation of the 17α-hydroxy group (nomegestrol acetate) nearly abolished it (0.23%).

The discovery of the retained and potentiated progestogenic activity of 19-norsteroids like 19-norprogesterone resulted in the synthesis of norethisterone, and in turn, the introduction of the first hormonal contraceptives. It was reasoned that since ethisterone (17α-ethinyltestosterone) is orally active, and since 19-norprogesterone is a very potent progestin parenterally, that 17α-ethynyl-19-nortestosterone (known now as norethisterone or norethindrone) might be a potent, orally active progestin, and indeed, this was found to be the case.

== Chemistry ==
=== Derivatives ===
19-Norprogesterone is the parent compound of a group of medically used progestins, which includes the following:

- 17α-Hydroxy-19-norprogesterone (gestronol)
  - Gestonorone caproate (17α-hydroxy-19-norprogesterone hexanoate)
  - Nomegestrol acetate (6-methyl-17α-hydroxy-δ^{6}-19-norprogesterone acetate)
  - Norgestomet (11β-methyl-17α-hydroxy-19-norprogesterone acetate) (veterinary)
  - Segesterone acetate (nestorone) (16-methylene-17α-hydroxy-19-norprogesterone acetate)
- 17α-Methyl-19-norprogesterone (H-3510)
  - Demegestone (17α-methyl-δ^{9}-19-norprogesterone)
  - Promegestone (17α,21-dimethyl-δ^{9}-19-norprogesterone)
  - Trimegestone (21(S)-hydroxy-17α,21-dimethyl-δ^{9}-19-norprogesterone)

In addition, the testosterone analogue of 19-norprogesterone, 19-nortestosterone (also known as nandrolone), is an anabolic-androgenic steroid (AAS) and progestogen, and is the parent compound of a large group of AAS and progestins that includes norethisterone.

== See also ==
- 17α-Methylprogesterone
