= Estrane =

- Stereo structural formula of estrane ((1R,2S,10R,11S,15S)-15-methyl,heptadec)

Names
- IUPAC name 5ξ-Estrane
- Systematic IUPAC name (3aS,3bR,5aΞ,9aS,9bR,11aS)-11a-Methylhexadecahydro-1H-cyclopenta[a]phenanthrene

Identifiers
CAS Number	24749-37-9
3D model (JSmol)	Interactive image
Beilstein Reference	3125721
ChEBI	CHEBI:23966
ChemSpider	11179505; 4574149 (1R,2S,10R,11S,15S)-15-methyl,heptadec; 5256802 (1R,2S,7R,10R,11S,15S)-15-methyl,heptadec; 5256794 (1R,2S,7S,10R,11S,15S)-15-methyl,heptadec
PubChem CID	12313694; 5460658 (1R,2S,10R,11S,15S)-15-methyl,heptadec; 6857465 (1R,2S,7R,10R,11S,15S)-15-methyl,heptadec; 6857457 (1R,2S,7S,10R,11S,15S)-15-methyl,heptadec
CompTox Dashboard (EPA)	DTXSID60420109
- InChI: InChI=1S/C18H30/c1-18-11-4-7-17(18)16-9-8-13-5-2-3-6-14(13)15(16)10-12-18/h13-17H,2-12H2,1H3 Key: GRXPVLPQNMUNNX-UHFFFAOYSA-N
- SMILES: CC12CCCC1C1CCC3CCCCC3C1CC2

Properties
Chemical formula	C_{18}H_{30}
Molar mass	246.438 g·mol^{−1}
- Except where otherwise noted, data are given for materials in their standard state (at 25 °C [77 °F], 100 kPa). verify (what is ?) Infobox references

Estrane is a C18 steroid derivative, with a gonane core.

Estrenes are estrane derivatives that contain a double bond, with an example being nandrolone. Estratrienes (estrins) are estrane derivatives that contain three double bonds, for instance estrin (estra-1,3,5(10)-triene). A class of female sex hormones, estrogens, such as estradiol, estrone, and estriol are estratrienes.

== See also ==
- Androstane
- Pregnane
