= C21H28O4 =

The molecular formula C_{21}H_{28}O_{4} may refer to:

- 11-Dehydrocorticosterone
- 18-Deoxyaldosterone
- 21-Deoxycortisone
- Deprodone
- Formebolone
- 7-Keto-DHEA acetate
- 11-Nor-9-carboxy-THC
