= Deoxycortisone =

Deoxycortisone, or desoxycortisone, may refer to:

- 11-Dehydrocorticosterone (17-deoxycortisone; 21-hydroxypregn-4-ene-3,11,20-trione)
- 11-Deoxycortisol (11-deoxycortisone; 17α,21-dihydroxypregn-4-ene-3,20-dione)
- 21-Deoxycortisone (17α-hydroxypregn-4-ene-3,11,20-trione)

== See also ==
- Deoxycorticosterone
- Deoxycortisol
