= 11-Hydroxyprogesterone =

11-Hydroxyprogesterone (11-OHP) may refer to:

- 11α-Hydroxyprogesterone
- 11β-Hydroxyprogesterone (21-deoxycorticosterone)

== See also ==
- Hydroxyprogesterone
- Deoxycorticosterone
- Deoxycortisol
