= Formebolone =

Chemical compound

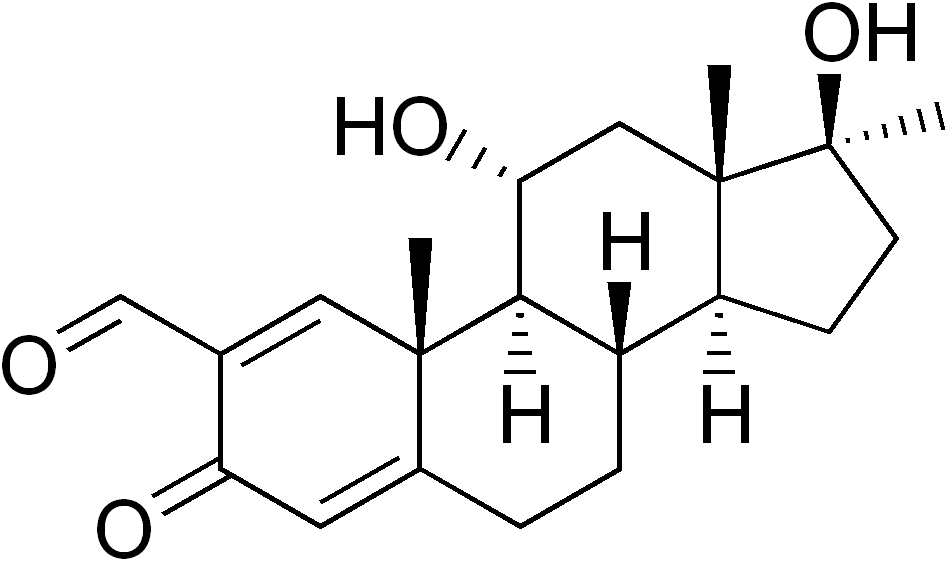

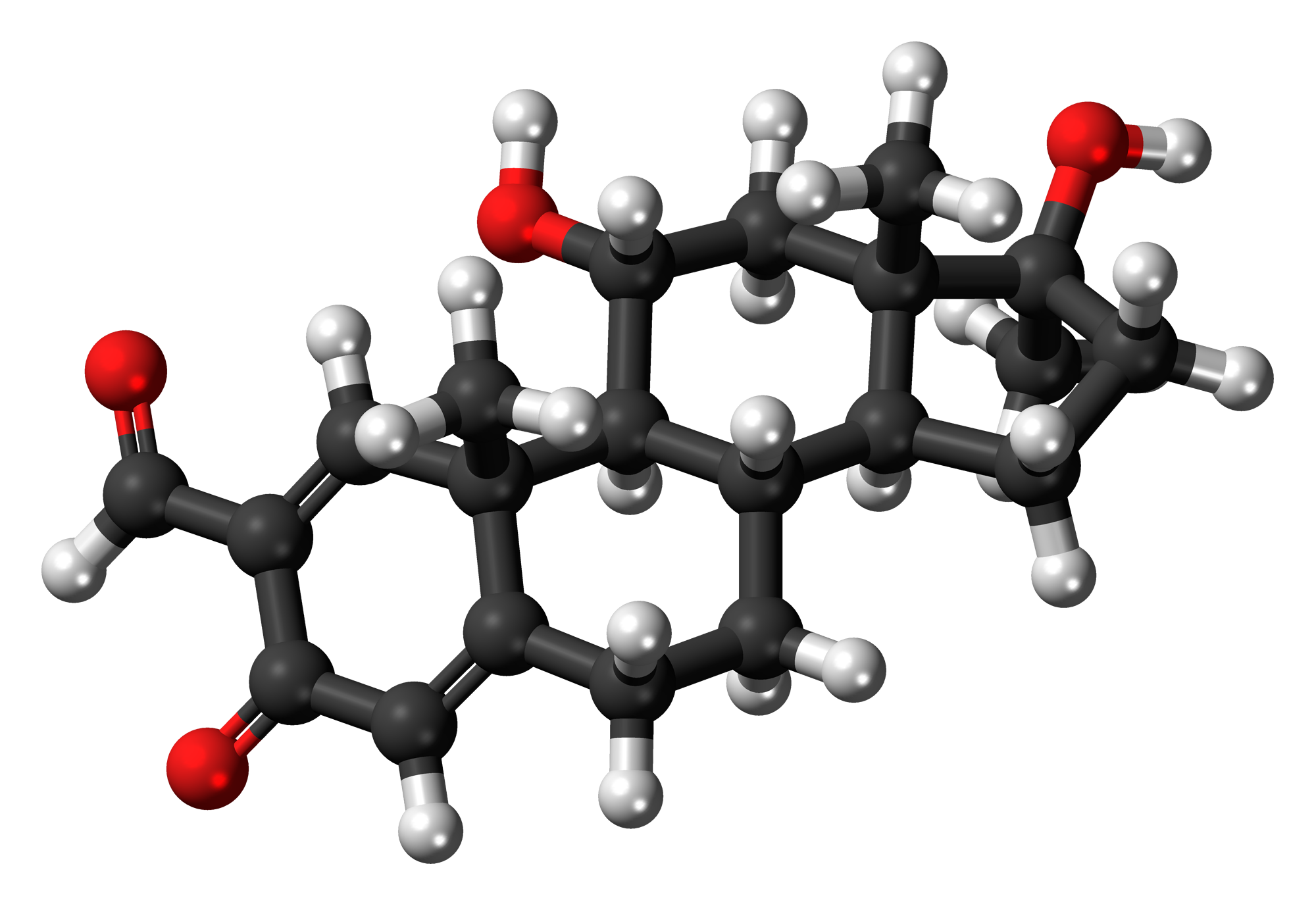

Clinical data
- Trade names: Esiclene, Hubernol, Metanor
- Other names: Formyldienolone; 2-Formyl-11α-hydroxy-17α-methyl-δ^{1}-testosterone
- Routes of administration: Oral

Legal status
- Legal status: BR: Class C5 (Anabolic steroids)

Identifiers
- IUPAC name: 8S,9S,10R,11R,13S,14S,17S)-11,17-dihydroxy-10,13,17-trimethyl-3-oxo-7,8,9,11,12,14,15,16-octahydro-6H-cyclopenta[a]phenanthrene-2-carbaldehyde
- CAS Number: 2454-11-7
- PubChem CID: 17150
- ChemSpider: 16234
- UNII: Z2MMV08KUQ
- ChEMBL: ChEMBL2107419
- CompTox Dashboard (EPA): DTXSID60179286
- ECHA InfoCard: 100.017.749

Chemical and physical data
- Formula: C_{21}H_{28}O_{4}
- Molar mass: 344.451 g·mol^{−1}
- 3D model (JSmol): Interactive image
- SMILES: C[C@@]1(CC[C@@H]2[C@@]1(C[C@H]([C@H]3[C@H]2CCC4=CC(=O)C(=C[C@]34C)C=O)O)C)O
- InChI: InChI=1S/C21H28O4/c1-19-9-12(11-22)16(23)8-13(19)4-5-14-15-6-7-21(3,25)20(15,2)10-17(24)18(14)19/h8-9,11,14-15,17-18,24-25H,4-7,10H2,1-3H3/t14-,15-,17+,18+,19-,20-,21-/m0/s1; Key:AMVODTGMYSRMNP-GNIMZFFESA-N

Formebolone (INN, BAN) (brand names Esiclene, Hubernol, Metanor), also known as formyldienolone, as well as 2-formyl-11α-hydroxy-17α-methyl-δ^{1}-testosterone, is an orally active anabolic-androgenic steroid (AAS) described as an anticatabolic and anabolic drug that is or has been marketed in Spain and Italy. As an AAS, it shows some anabolic activity, though it is inferior to testosterone in terms of potency, but is said to have virtually no androgenic activity. Formebolone counteracts the catabolic effects (control of nitrogen balance) of potent glucocorticoids like dexamethasone phosphate. A close analogue, roxibolone (and its long-acting ester variant decylroxibolone), shows similar antiglucocorticoid activity to formebolone but, in contrast, is devoid of activity as an AAS.

Roxibolone has been found not to bind to the glucocorticoid receptor, and it has been suggested that the antiglucocorticoid activity of roxibolone and formebolone may instead be mediated by modulation of enzymatic processes. Indeed, 11α- and 11β-hydroxyprogesterone (formebolone and roxibolone being 11α- and 11β-hydroxylated (respectively) similarly) are known to be potent inhibitors of 11β-hydroxysteroid dehydrogenase (11β-HSD), which is responsible for the biosynthesis of the potent endogenous glucocorticoids cortisol and corticosterone (from the precursors deoxycortisol and deoxycorticosterone, respectively). However, formebolone was found to be a very weak inhibitor of 11β-HSD type 2 (IC_{50} > 10 μM), although this specific isoenzyme of 11β-HSD is responsible for the inactivation of glucocorticoids rather than their production.
