= Roxibolone =

Chemical compound

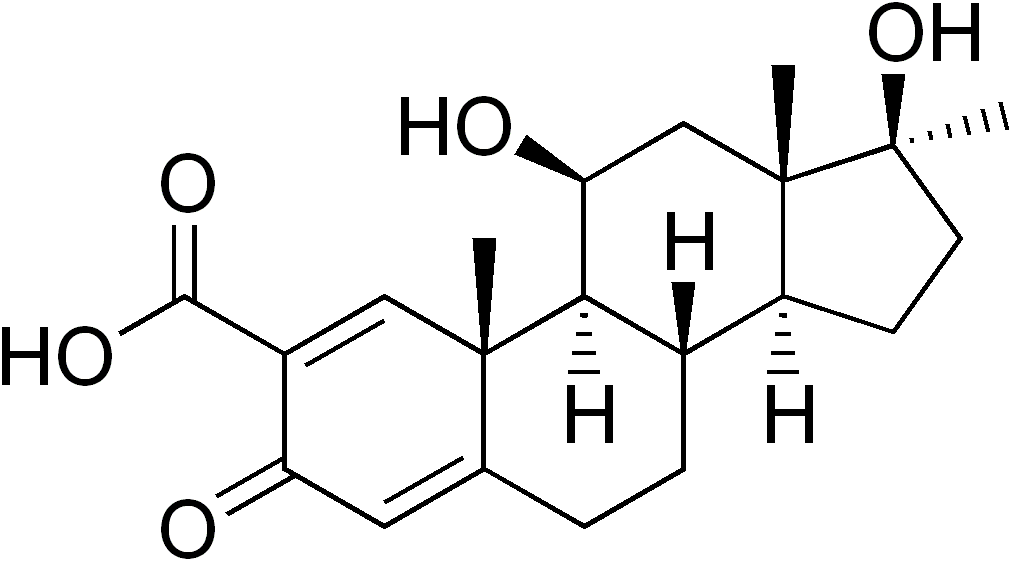

Clinical data
- Other names: BR-906; 11β,17β-Dihydroxy-17α-methyl-3-oxoandrosta-1,4-diene-2-carboxylic acid

Identifiers
- IUPAC name: (8S,9S,10R,11S,13S,14S,17S)-11,17-dihydroxy-10,13,17-trimethyl-3-oxo-7,8,9,11,12,14,15,16-octahydro-6H-cyclopenta[a]phenanthrene-2-carboxylic acid
- CAS Number: 60023-92-9
- PubChem CID: 68795
- ChemSpider: 62035
- UNII: 3R7NLP419C
- CompTox Dashboard (EPA): DTXSID20208728

Chemical and physical data
- Formula: C_{21}H_{28}O_{5}
- Molar mass: 360.450 g·mol^{−1}
- 3D model (JSmol): Interactive image
- SMILES: C[C@@]1(CC[C@@H]2[C@@]1(C[C@@H]([C@H]3[C@H]2CCC4=CC(=O)C(=C[C@]34C)C(=O)O)O)C)O
- InChI: InChI=1S/C21H28O5/c1-19-9-13(18(24)25)15(22)8-11(19)4-5-12-14-6-7-21(3,26)20(14,2)10-16(23)17(12)19/h8-9,12,14,16-17,23,26H,4-7,10H2,1-3H3,(H,24,25)/t12-,14-,16-,17+,19-,20-,21-/m0/s1; Key:JOFBZBDWOWPUMO-QARKFJNLSA-N

Roxibolone (INN; development code BR-906; also known as 11β,17β-dihydroxy-17α-methyl-3-oxoandrosta-1,4-diene-2-carboxylic acid) is a steroidal antiglucocorticoid described as an anticholesterolemic (cholesterol-lowering) and anabolic drug which was never marketed. Roxibolone is closely related to formebolone, which shows antiglucocorticoid activity similarly and, with the exception of having a carboxaldehyde group at the C2 position instead of a carboxylic acid group, roxibolone is structurally almost identical to. The 2-decyl ester of roxibolone, decylroxibolone (development code BR-917), is a long-acting prodrug of roxibolone with similar activity.

In rats, roxibolone counteracts the catabolic effects (control of nitrogen balance) and increased alkaline phosphatase levels induced by the potent glucocorticoid dexamethasone phosphate. It does not bind to the glucocorticoid receptor however, and its antiglucocorticoid activity may instead be mediated by enzyme inhibition. In accordance, 11α- and 11β-hydroxyprogesterone are known to be potent inhibitors of 11β-hydroxysteroid dehydrogenase (11β-HSD), which is responsible for the biosynthesis of the potent endogenous glucocorticoids cortisol and corticosterone (from the precursors deoxycortisol and deoxycorticosterone, respectively). As roxibolone is 11β-hydroxylated similarly, it may act in a likewise fashion. However, formebolone was found to be a very weak inhibitor of 11β-HSD type 2, although this specific isoenzyme is responsible for the inactivation of glucocorticoids rather than their production.

Unlike formebolone, which is additionally an anabolic-androgenic steroid (AAS), roxibolone is devoid of affinity for the androgen receptor and possesses no androgenic or myotrophic activity in animal assays. For this reason, it has been said that roxibolone may be much better tolerated in comparison.
