= C21H24O2 =

The molecular formula C_{21}H_{24}O_{2} (molar mass: 308.414 g/mol) may refer to:

- Gestrinone;
- Tosagestin, or 11-methylene-δ^{15}-norethisterone.
