= C22H30O3 =

The molecular formula C_{22}H_{30}O_{3} (molar mass : 342.47 g/mol) may refer to:

- Anacardic acid, a chemical compound found in the shell of the cashew nut
- Endrisone, a steroid
- Megestrol, a progesterone derivative with antineoplastic properties used in the treatment of advanced carcinoma of the breast and endometrium
- Sargachromanol A
- SC-5233, an antimineralocorticoid
- Trimegestone, a steroid
