= BKP =

BKP may refer to:

== Political parties ==
- United Cyprus Party (Turkish: Birleşik Kıbrıs Partisi)
- Bulgarian Communist Party Bulgarian: Bulgarska Komunisticheska Partiya)
- Belarusian Peasant Party (Belarusian: Belorusskaia krestyanskaia partiia)
- Bhutan Kuen-Nyam Party

== Transport ==
- Bangkok Airways (ICAO: BKP)
- Bangkok Port (ท่าเรือกรุงเทพ), a maritime port in Thailand
- Bakhtiyarpur Junction railway station (station code: BKP), India
- Batarejnyj kommandnyj punkt, a BTR-80 variant

== Other ==
- Bala language (ISO 693-3: bkp), a Bantu language
- Bingham's Kennebec Purchase; see Historical United States Census totals for Somerset County, Maine
- Bromoketoprogesterone, a progestin medication
- Boss Key Productions, a video game studio
- Bounded knapsack problem, a problem in combinatorial optimization
