= C21H28O5 =

The molecular formula C_{21}H_{28}O_{5} (molar mass: 360.44 g/mol, exact mass: 360.193674 u) may refer to:

- Aldosterone
- Cortisone
- Prednisolone, a corticosteroid
- Roxibolone, an anabolic steroid
