= 11-Ketoprogesterone =

Chemical compound

Clinical data
- Trade names: Ketogestin
- Other names: Bio 66; U-1258; 11-Oxoprogesterone; Pregn-4-ene-3,11,20-trione

Identifiers
- IUPAC name: (8S,9S,10R,13S,14S,17S)-17-Acetyl-10,13-dimethyl-2,6,7,8,9,12,14,15,16,17-decahydro-1H-cyclopenta[a]phenanthrene-3,11-dione
- CAS Number: 516-15-4
- PubChem CID: 94166
- ChemSpider: 84982
- UNII: 9Y1Y86O4T5
- ChEMBL: ChEMBL284253
- CompTox Dashboard (EPA): DTXSID101031475
- ECHA InfoCard: 100.007.476

Chemical and physical data
- Formula: C_{21}H_{28}O_{3}
- Molar mass: 328.452 g·mol^{−1}
- 3D model (JSmol): Interactive image
- SMILES: CC(=O)[C@H]1CC[C@@H]2[C@@]1(CC(=O)[C@H]3[C@H]2CCC4=CC(=O)CC[C@]34C)C
- InChI: InChI=1S/C21H28O3/c1-12(22)16-6-7-17-15-5-4-13-10-14(23)8-9-20(13,2)19(15)18(24)11-21(16,17)3/h10,15-17,19H,4-9,11H2,1-3H3/t15-,16+,17-,19+,20-,21+/m0/s1; Key:WKAVAGKRWFGIEA-DADBAOPHSA-N

11-Ketoprogesterone (brand name Ketogestin; former developmental code names Bio 66, U-1258), or 11-oxoprogesterone, also known as pregn-4-ene-3,11,20-trione, is a pregnane steroid related to cortisone (11-keto-17α,21-dihydroxyprogesterone) that was formerly used in veterinary medicine in the treatment of bovine ketosis. It was synthesized in 1940. The steroid has profound effects on carbohydrate metabolism and possesses activities associated with adrenal cortex hormones like cortisone. However, it is non-toxic even in high dosages, suggesting that it lacks conventional glucocorticoid activity, and it does not possess mineralocorticoid activity, unlike other adrenocortical hormones. 11-Ketoprogesterone may act through membrane glucocorticoid receptors.

11-Ketoprogesterone is reportedly devoid of androgenic, estrogenic, and progestogenic activity. 11β-Hydroxyprogesterone has also been reported to be devoid of progestogenic activity, but has subsequently been reported to possess about 1% of the progestogenic activity of progesterone. A halogenated derivative of 11-ketoprogesterone, 9α-bromo-11-ketoprogesterone, possesses relatively high progestogenic activity. Similarly to 11α-hydroxyprogesterone and 11β-hydroxyprogesterone, 11-ketoprogesterone is reported to act as an inhibitor of the enzyme 11β-hydroxysteroid dehydrogenase. It has also been found to act as a weak negative allosteric modulator of the GABA_{A} receptor.

== See also ==
- 11-Dehydrocorticosterone (11-keto-21-hydroxyprogesterone)
- 21-Deoxycortisone (11-keto-17α-hydroxyprogesterone)
