= Medrysone =

Chemical compound

Clinical data
- Trade names: HMS, Medrocort, others
- Other names: NSC-63278; Hydroxymethylprogesterone; Methylhydroxyprogesterone; Hydroxymesterone; 6α-Methyl-11β-hydroxyprogesterone; 6α-Methyl-11β-hydroxypregn-4-ene-3,20-dione
- AHFS/Drugs.com: Micromedex Detailed Consumer Information
- MedlinePlus: a606003
- Routes of administration: Eye drops
- ATC code: S01BA08 (WHO)

Legal status
- Legal status: US: Discontinued

Identifiers
- IUPAC name: (6S,8S,9S,10R,11S,13R,14S,17S)- 17-acetyl-11-hydroxy-6,10,13-trimethyl-1,2,6,7,8,9, 11,12,14,15,16,17- dodecahydrocyclopenta[a] phenanthren-3-one
- CAS Number: 2668-66-8
- PubChem CID: 247839
- IUPHAR/BPS: 7086
- DrugBank: DB00253
- ChemSpider: 216968
- UNII: D2UFC189XF
- KEGG: D02289
- ChEMBL: ChEMBL1201173
- CompTox Dashboard (EPA): DTXSID6045371
- ECHA InfoCard: 100.018.371

Chemical and physical data
- Formula: C_{22}H_{32}O_{3}
- Molar mass: 344.495 g·mol^{−1}
- 3D model (JSmol): Interactive image
- SMILES: C[C@H]1C[C@H]2[C@@H]3CC[C@@H]([C@]3(C[C@@H]([C@@H]2[C@@]4(C1=CC(=O)CC4)C)O)C)C(=O)C
- InChI: InChI=1S/C22H32O3/c1-12-9-15-17-6-5-16(13(2)23)22(17,4)11-19(25)20(15)21(3)8-7-14(24)10-18(12)21/h10,12,15-17,19-20,25H,5-9,11H2,1-4H3/t12-,15-,16+,17-,19-,20+,21-,22+/m0/s1; Key:GZENKSODFLBBHQ-ILSZZQPISA-N

Medrysone (INN, USAN; brand names HMS, Medrocort, others; former developmental code NSC-63278; also known as hydroxymethylprogesterone, methylhydroxyprogesterone, hydroxymesterone, 6α-methyl-11β-hydroxyprogesterone, or 6α-methyl-11β-hydroxypregn-4-ene-3,20-dione) is a synthetic glucocorticoid that is or has been used in the treatment of inflammatory eye diseases. It has been discontinued in the United States. Although it is very similar in structure to progesterone, neither progestogenic nor androgenic activity has been demonstrated for or attributed to medrysone.

== Environmental presence ==
In 2021, medrysone was one of the 12 compounds identified in sludge samples taken from 12 wastewater treatment plants in California that were associated with estrogenic activity in in vitro.

== See also ==
- 9α-Bromo-11-ketoprogesterone
- 11β-Hydroxyprogesterone
- Endrisone
- Flugestone
- Fluorometholone
