= Norgestrienone =

Chemical compound

Clinical data
- Trade names: Ogyline, Planor, Miniplanor
- Other names: RU-2010; A-301; 17α-Ethynyltrienolone; 17α-Ethynyltrenbolone; Δ^{9,11}-Norethisterone; 17α-Ethynylestra-4,9,11-trien-17β-ol-3-one
- Routes of administration: By mouth
- Drug class: Progestogen; Progestin; Androgen; Anabolic steroid
- ATC code: G03AC07 (WHO)

Identifiers
- IUPAC name: (8S,13S,14S,17R)-17-ethynyl-17-hydroxy-13-methyl-1,2,6,7,8,14,15,16-octahydrocyclopenta[a]phenanthren-3-one
- CAS Number: 848-21-5
- PubChem CID: 13313
- ChemSpider: 12749
- UNII: 89386PYU9O
- KEGG: D07220
- CompTox Dashboard (EPA): DTXSID30878491
- ECHA InfoCard: 100.011.544

Chemical and physical data
- Formula: C_{20}H_{22}O_{2}
- Molar mass: 294.394 g·mol^{−1}
- 3D model (JSmol): Interactive image
- SMILES: O=C4\C=C3/C(=C2/C=C\[C@]1([C@@H](CC[C@]1(C#C)O)[C@@H]2CC3)C)CC4
- InChI: InChI=1S/C20H22O2/c1-3-20(22)11-9-18-17-6-4-13-12-14(21)5-7-15(13)16(17)8-10-19(18,20)2/h1,8,10,12,17-18,22H,4-7,9,11H2,2H3/t17-,18+,19+,20+/m1/s1; Key:GVDMJXQHPUYPHP-FYQPLNBISA-N

Norgestrienone, sold under the brand names Ogyline, Planor, and Miniplanor, is a progestin medication which has been used in birth control pills, sometimes in combination with ethinylestradiol. It was developed by Roussel Uclaf and has been registered for use only in France. Under the brand name Planor, it has been marketed in France as 2 mg norgestrienone and 50 μg ethinylestradiol tablets. It is taken by mouth.

Norgestrienone is a progestin, or a synthetic progestogen, and hence is an agonist of the progesterone receptor, the biological target of progestogens like progesterone. It has some androgenic activity.

Norgestrienone was first described in the literature in 1965. It is sometimes referred to as a "second-generation" progestin. Norgestrienone is no longer available.

== Medical uses ==
Norgestrienone was used in hormonal contraception to prevent pregnancy. It has typically been used as an oral contraceptive at a dosage of 2 mg/day in combination with ethinylestradiol and 350 μ/day when used alone.

== Pharmacology ==
=== Pharmacodynamics ===
Norgestrienone has been found to possess similar affinity for the progesterone receptor and androgen receptor, and in accordance, has some androgenic activity. The androgenic activity of norgestrienone is greater than that of other 19-nortestosterone derivatives due to the presence of the C9(11) double bond, which enhances said activity. The ratio of progestogenic to androgenic activity appears to be much lower for norgestrienone that it is for other 19-nortestosterone progestins such as norethisterone and levonorgestrel. Gestrinone, the 18-methyl analogue of norgestrienone, has even greater androgenic activity than norgestrienone, as this modification increases androgenic activity similarly.

Relative affinities (%) of norgestrienone and related steroids
Compound	PR	AR	ER	GR	MR	SHBG	CBG
Norethisterone	155–156	43–45	<0.1	2.7–2.8	0.2	?	?
Norgestrienone	63–65	70	<0.1	11	1.8	?	?
Levonorgestrel	170	84–87	<0.1	14	0.6–0.9	?	?
Gestrinone	75–76	83–85	<0.1, 3–10	77	3.2	?	?
Notes: Values are percentages (%). Reference ligands (100%) were progesterone for the PR, testosterone for the AR, E2 for the ER, DEXA for the GR, aldosterone for the MR, DHT for SHBG, and cortisol for CBG. Sources:

=== Pharmacokinetics ===
The metabolism of norgestrienone in humans has been studied.

== Chemistry ==
Norgestrienone, also known as 17α-ethynyl-19-nor-δ^{9,11}-testosterone or as 17α-ethynylestra-4,9,11-trien-17β-ol-3-one, as well as δ^{9,11}-norethisterone or 17α-ethynyltrienolone (17α-ethynyltrenbolone), is a synthetic estrane steroid and a derivative of testosterone and 19-nortestosterone. It is structurally related to the anabolic steroid trenbolone (19-nor-δ^{9,11}-testosterone; the non-17α-ethynylated analogue of norgestrienone), the progestogenic and androgenic steroid gestrinone (the 13β-ethyl variant or 18-methyl derivative of norgestrienone), and the anabolic steroid tetrahydrogestrinone (the 18-methyl and 17α-ethyl variant of norgestrienone).

== History ==
Norgestrienone was first described in the literature in 1965. It is sometimes referred to as a "second-generation" progestin based on its time of introduction.

== Society and culture ==
=== Generic names ===
Norgestrienone is the generic name of the drug and its INN. It is also known by its developmental code names RU-2010 and A-301.

=== Brand names ===
Norgestrienone has been marketed under the brand names Ogyline, Planor, and Miniplanor.

=== Availability ===
Norgestrienone is no longer marketed and hence is no longer available in any country. It was previously used in France. The medication was never marketed in the United States.

== Research ==
Norgestrienone has been studied for use in male hormonal contraception.
