= Quingestanol acetate =

Chemical compound

Clinical data
- Trade names: Demovis, Pilomin, others
- Other names: W-4540; Norethisterone acetate 3-cyclopentyl enol ether; 17α-Ethynyl-19-nortestosterone acetate 3-cyclopentyl enol ether; ENTACP; (17β)-3-(Cyclopentyloxy)-17-ethynylestra-3,5-dien-17-yl acetate
- Routes of administration: By mouth
- Drug class: Progestogen; Progestin; Progestogen ester
- ATC code: G03AC04 (WHO) G03AA02 (WHO) (with an estrogen)

Legal status
- Legal status: In general: ℞ (Prescription only)

Identifiers
- IUPAC name: [(8R,9S,10R,13S,14S,17R)-3-cyclopentyloxy-17-ethynyl-13-methyl-2,7,8,9,10,11,12,14,15,16-decahydro-1H-cyclopenta[a]phenanthren-17-yl] acetate
- CAS Number: 3000-39-3
- PubChem CID: 18142
- DrugBank: DB14679
- ChemSpider: 17136
- UNII: M33GGZ63KG
- ChEBI: CHEBI:135661
- ChEMBL: ChEMBL2105291
- CompTox Dashboard (EPA): DTXSID50952409
- ECHA InfoCard: 100.019.163

Chemical and physical data
- Formula: C_{27}H_{36}O_{3}
- Molar mass: 408.582 g·mol^{−1}
- 3D model (JSmol): Interactive image
- SMILES: O=C(O[C@@]5(C#C)CC[C@@H]4[C@]5(C)CC[C@@H]3[C@@H]2C(\C=C(\OC1CCCC1)CC2)=C/C[C@H]34)C
- InChI: InChI=1S/C27H36O3/c1-4-27(30-18(2)28)16-14-25-24-11-9-19-17-21(29-20-7-5-6-8-20)10-12-22(19)23(24)13-15-26(25,27)3/h1,9,17,20,22-25H,5-8,10-16H2,2-3H3/t22-,23+,24+,25-,26-,27-/m0/s1; Key:FLGJKPPXEKYCBY-AKCFYGDASA-N

Quingestanol acetate, sold under the brand names Demovis and Pilomin among others, is a progestin medication which was used in birth control pills but is no longer marketed. It is taken by mouth.

Quingestanol acetate is a progestin, or a synthetic progestogen, and hence is an agonist of the progesterone receptor, the biological target of progestogens like progesterone. It has weak androgenic and estrogenic activity and no other important hormonal activity. The medication is a prodrug of norethisterone in the body, with quingestanol and norethisterone acetate occurring as intermediates.

Quingestanol acetate was patented in 1963 and was introduced for medical use in 1972. It was marketed in Italy.

== Medical uses ==
Quingestanol acetate was used as an oral, once-a-month, or postcoital hormonal contraceptive.

== Pharmacology ==
Quingestanol acetate is a progestogen, and also has weak androgenic and estrogenic activity. It is a prodrug of norethisterone, with both quingestanol and norethisterone acetate serving as intermediates in the transformation. Unlike penmesterol (methyltestosterone 3-cyclopentyl enol ether) and quinestrol (ethinylestradiol 3-cyclopentyl ether), quingestanol acetate is not stored in fat and does not have a prolonged duration of action.

== Chemistry ==
Quingestanol acetate, also known as norethisterone 17β-acetate 3-cyclopentyl enol ether or as 17α-ethynyl-19-nortestosterone 17β-acetate 3-cyclopentyl enol ether (ENTACP), as well as 3-(cyclopentyloxy)-17α-ethynylestra-3,5-dien-17β-yl acetate, is a synthetic estrane steroid and a derivative of testosterone. It is specifically a derivative of 19-nortestosterone and 17α-ethynyltestosterone, or of norethisterone (17α-ethynyl-19-nortestosterone), in which a cyclopentyl enol ether group has been attached at the C3 position and an acetate ester has been attached at the C17β position. Quingestanol acetate is the C17β acetate ester of quingestanol (norethisterone 3-cyclopentyl enol ether).

== History ==
Quingestanol acetate was patented in 1963 and marketed in Italy in 1972.

== Society and culture ==
=== Generic names ===
Quingestanol acetate is the generic name of the drug and its INN and USAN.

=== Brand names ===
Quingestanol acetate was marketed under the brand names Demovis, Pilomin, Riglovis, and Unovis.
