= Quingestanol =

Chemical compound

Clinical data
- Other names: Norethisterone 3-cyclopentyl enol ether; 3-(Cyclopentyloxy)-17α-ethynylestra-3,5-dien-17β-ol
- Drug class: Progestin; Progestogen
- ATC code: G03AC04 (WHO) G03AA02 (WHO) (with an estrogen)

Identifiers
- IUPAC name: (8R,9S,10R,13S,14S,17R)-3-cyclopentyloxy-17-ethynyl-13-methyl-2,7,8,9,10,11,12,14,15,16-decahydro-1H-cyclopenta[a]phenanthren-17-ol
- CAS Number: 10592-65-1
- PubChem CID: 9842127
- ChemSpider: 8017842
- UNII: 1A635076CE
- CompTox Dashboard (EPA): DTXSID80147422
- ECHA InfoCard: 100.031.078

Chemical and physical data
- Formula: C_{25}H_{34}O_{2}
- Molar mass: 366.545 g·mol^{−1}
- 3D model (JSmol): Interactive image
- SMILES: O(\C4=C\C3=C\C[C@@H]2[C@H](CC[C@]1(C)[C@@](C#C)(O)CC[C@H]12)[C@H]3CC4)C5CCCC5
- InChI: InChI=1S/C25H34O2/c1-3-25(26)15-13-23-22-10-8-17-16-19(27-18-6-4-5-7-18)9-11-20(17)21(22)12-14-24(23,25)2/h1,8,16,18,20-23,26H,4-7,9-15H2,2H3/t20-,21+,22+,23-,24-,25-/m0/s1; Key:PCJFRMOEZQQSAX-AIOSZGMZSA-N

Quingestanol (INN, BAN), also known as norethisterone 3-cyclopentyl enol ether, is a progestin of the 19-nortestosterone group which was never marketed. It is a prodrug of norethisterone. An acylated derivative, quingestanol acetate, is used as a pharmaceutical drug.

== See also ==
- List of progestogens
