= Flugestone acetate =

Progestin medication

Clinical data
- Trade names: Cronolone, others
- Other names: Flurogestone acetate; Fluorogestone acetate; FGA; NSC-65411; SC-9880; 17α-Acetoxy-9α-fluoro-11β-hydroxyprogesterone
- Routes of administration: Intravaginal
- Drug class: Progestogen; Progestin; Progestogen ester

Identifiers
- IUPAC name: [(8S,9R,10S,11S,13S,14S,17R)-17-acetyl-9-fluoro-11-hydroxy-10,13-dimethyl-3-oxo-1,2,6,7,8,11,12,14,15,16-decahydrocyclopenta[a]phenanthren-17-yl] acetate
- CAS Number: 2529-45-5
- PubChem CID: 10476437
- ChemSpider: 8651847
- UNII: X60881643X
- KEGG: D04235
- ChEMBL: ChEMBL2106773
- CompTox Dashboard (EPA): DTXSID6046210
- ECHA InfoCard: 100.017.979

Chemical and physical data
- Formula: C_{23}H_{31}FO_{5}
- Molar mass: 406.494 g·mol^{−1}
- 3D model (JSmol): Interactive image
- SMILES: CC(=O)O[C@@]1(CC[C@H]2[C@@H]3CCC4=CC(=O)CC[C@]4(C)[C@@]3(F)[C@@H](O)C[C@]12C)C(C)=O
- InChI: InChI=1S/C23H31FO5/c1-13(25)22(29-14(2)26)10-8-17-18-6-5-15-11-16(27)7-9-20(15,3)23(18,24)19(28)12-21(17,22)4/h11,17-19,28H,5-10,12H2,1-4H3/t17-,18-,19-,20-,21-,22-,23-/m0/s1; Key:JKQQZJHNUVDHKP-FQJIPJFPSA-N

Flugestone acetate (FGA), sold under the brand name Cronolone among others, is a progestin medication which is used in veterinary medicine.

== Uses ==
=== Veterinary ===
FGA is used as an intravaginal sponge preparation to synchronize estrus in ewes and goats.

== Chemistry ==
FGA, also known as 17α-acetoxy-9α-fluoro-11β-hydroxyprogesterone or as 17α-acetoxy-9α-fluoro-11β-hydroxypregn-4-ene-3,20-dione, is a synthetic pregnane steroid and a derivative of progesterone and 17α-hydroxyprogesterone. It is the C17α acetate ester of flugestone.

== History ==
FGA was developed and marketed by G.D. Searle & Company in the 1960s.

== Society and culture ==
=== Generic names ===
Flugestone acetate is the generic name of the drug and its INN and BANM, while flurogestone acetate is its USAN. Flugestone is the BAN and DCIT of the unesterified free alcohol form. FGA is also known by its developmental code names NSC-65411 and SC-9880.

=== Brand names ===
FGA is or has been marketed under the brand names Chronogest, Chrono-Gest, Crono-Gest, Cronolone, Gyncro-Mate, Ova-Gest, Ovakron, Synchro-Mate, Syncro Part, and Syncropart.

=== Availability ===
FGA is marketed for veterinary use in Australia, France, Ireland, Israel, Italy, the Netherlands, South Africa, and the United Kingdom.
