= Bromoketoprogesterone =

Chemical compound

Clinical data
- Trade names: Braxarone
- Other names: BKP; BOP; NSC-15990; 9α-Bromo-11-oxoprogesterone; Braxarone; Bromo-oxy-progesterone; BOP; 9α-Bromopregn-4-en-3,11,20-trione; Bromopregnenetrione
- Routes of administration: By mouth

Identifiers
- IUPAC name: (8S,10S,13S,14S,17S)-17-Acetyl-9-bromo-10,13-dimethyl-1,2,6,7,8,12,14,15,16,17-decahydrocyclopenta[a]phenanthrene-3,11-dione
- CAS Number: 2527-11-9
- PubChem CID: 197766
- ChemSpider: 196517
- UNII: O784P63H1N
- ChEBI: CHEBI:34585

Chemical and physical data
- Formula: C_{21}H_{27}BrO_{3}
- Molar mass: 407.348 g·mol^{−1}
- 3D model (JSmol): Interactive image
- SMILES: CC(=O)[C@H]1CC[C@@H]2[C@@]1(CC(=O)C3([C@H]2CCC4=CC(=O)CC[C@@]43C)Br)C
- InChI: InChI=1S/C21H27BrO3/c1-12(23)15-6-7-16-17-5-4-13-10-14(24)8-9-20(13,3)21(17,22)18(25)11-19(15,16)2/h10,15-17H,4-9,11H2,1-3H3/t15-,16+,17+,19-,20+,21?/m1/s1; Key:NWFOHSCPTMLQIH-WHJJYKQUSA-N

Bromoketoprogesterone (BKP), also known as 9α-bromo-11-oxoprogesterone (BOP), and known by the tentative brand name Braxarone (Squibb), is an orally active progestin which does not appear to have been marketed.

== Pharmacology ==
=== Pharmacodynamics ===
Whereas 11-ketoprogesterone and 11β-hydroxyprogesterone are virtually devoid of progestogenic activity (although 11β-hydroxyprogesterone has been reported to possess about 1% of the progestogenic activity of progesterone), the progestogenic activity of BKP is restored and is in fact relatively high. In contrast, 9α-fluoro-11β-hydroxyprogesterone has much lower progestogenic activity with only about 8 times that of 11β-hydroxyprogesterone. In addition, whereas 9α-fluoro-11β-hydroxyprogesterone has pronounced mineralocorticoid effects, BKP lacks such effects.

BKP has been described as a weaker progestogen. It has been used at doses of as much as 300 mg orally per day.

In addition to its activity as a progestogen, BKP has glucocorticoid activity.

=== Pharmacokinetics ===
The pharmacokinetics of BKP have been reviewed.

== Chemistry ==
=== Synthesis ===
Chemical syntheses of BKP have been published.

== History ==
It was developed in the 1950s and, along with the testosterone derivatives ethisterone, norethisterone, normethandrone, and norethandrolone and the progesterone derivative hydroxyprogesterone acetate, was one of the first orally active progestogens to be developed. Similarly to various other progestogens, BKP has been studied in the treatment of breast cancer in women. Evaluated in 1959, it was the first oral progestin to be found effective in the treatment of breast cancer. It induced regression in 20% of women with advanced breast cancer at a dosage of 300 mg/day orally.

== See also ==
- Flugestone
- Fluorometholone
- Haloprogesterone
- Medrysone
