= Endrisone =

Chemical compound

Clinical data
- Trade names: Aldrisone
- Other names: Delta-medrysone; 6α-Methyl-11β-hydroxypregna-1,4-diene-3,20-dione; 6α-Methyl-11β-hydroxy-Δ^{1}-progesterone
- Routes of administration: Topical, ophthalmic

Identifiers
- IUPAC name: (6S,8S,9S,10R,11S,13S,14S,17S)-17-acetyl-11-hydroxy-6,10,13-trimethyl-6,7,8,9,11,12,14,15,16,17-decahydrocyclopenta[a]phenanthren-3-one
- CAS Number: 35100-44-8
- PubChem CID: 71422
- ChemSpider: 64512
- UNII: 1QZ096EIEF
- KEGG: D03995
- ChEMBL: ChEMBL2104631
- CompTox Dashboard (EPA): DTXSID401043364
- ECHA InfoCard: 100.047.587

Chemical and physical data
- Formula: C_{22}H_{30}O_{3}
- Molar mass: 342.479 g·mol^{−1}
- 3D model (JSmol): Interactive image
- SMILES: C[C@H]1C[C@H]2[C@@H]3CC[C@@H]([C@]3(C[C@@H]([C@@H]2[C@@]4(C1=CC(=O)C=C4)C)O)C)C(=O)C
- InChI: InChI=1S/C22H30O3/c1-12-9-15-17-6-5-16(13(2)23)22(17,4)11-19(25)20(15)21(3)8-7-14(24)10-18(12)21/h7-8,10,12,15-17,19-20,25H,5-6,9,11H2,1-4H3/t12-,15-,16+,17-,19-,20+,21-,22+/m0/s1; Key:VDNZZIYSCXESNI-ILSZZQPISA-N

Endrisone (INN; also known as endrysone (USAN); brand name Aldrisone) is a synthetic, steroidal glucocorticoid which is or has been marketed in Italy by SIFI. It is used as a topical and ophthalmic anti-inflammatory drug in the treatment of skin and eye conditions, respectively.

== See also ==
- 11β-Hydroxyprogesterone
- Medrysone
