= Flugestone =

Chemical compound

Identifiers
- IUPAC name: (8S,9R,10S,11S,13S,14S,17R)-17-acetyl-9-fluoro-11,17-dihydroxy-10,13-dimethyl-1,2,6,7,8,11,12,14,15,16-decahydrocyclopenta[a]phenanthren-3-one
- CAS Number: 337-03-1
- PubChem CID: 254765
- ChemSpider: 223326
- UNII: NT3ET34748
- KEGG: D07968
- CompTox Dashboard (EPA): DTXSID0048765
- ECHA InfoCard: 100.005.830

Chemical and physical data
- Formula: C_{21}H_{29}FO_{4}
- Molar mass: 364.457 g·mol^{−1}
- 3D model (JSmol): Interactive image
- SMILES: CC(=O)C1(CCC2C1(CC(C3(C2CCC4=CC(=O)CCC43C)F)O)C)O
- InChI: InChI=1S/C21H29FO4/c1-12(23)20(26)9-7-15-16-5-4-13-10-14(24)6-8-18(13,2)21(16,22)17(25)11-19(15,20)3/h10,15-17,25-26H,4-9,11H2,1-3H3/t15-,16-,17-,18-,19-,20-,21-/m0/s1; Key:OFSXGKOMEGSTSE-BPSSIEEOSA-N

Flugestone (INN, BAN), also known as flurogestone, as well as 9α-fluoro-11β,17α-dihydroxyprogesterone, is a steroidal progestin of the 17α-hydroxyprogesterone group that was never marketed. An acetate ester, flurogestone acetate, is used in veterinary medicine.

== See also ==
- 9α-Bromo-11-ketoprogesterone
- Fluorometholone
- Medrysone
- Norgestomet
