= 18-Deoxyaldosterone =

Chemical compound

Clinical data
- Other names: 11β,18-epoxy-21-hydroxypregn-4-ene-3,20-dione, 11β-11,18-epoxy-21-hydroxypregn-4-ene-3,20-dione, 11β,18-epoxy-21-hydroxy-progesterone, 21-hydroxy-11β,18-oxido-4-pregnene-3,20-dione
- Drug class: Antimineralocorticoid

Identifiers
- CAS Number: 2507-88-2
- PubChem CID: 188963
- ChemSpider: 164193
- UNII: S4YT68R2XR
- CompTox Dashboard (EPA): DTXSID30947934

Chemical and physical data
- Formula: C_{21}H_{28}O_{4}
- Molar mass: 344.451 g·mol^{−1}
- 3D model (JSmol): Interactive image
- SMILES: C[C@]12CCC(=O)C=C1CC[C@@H]3[C@@H]2[C@@H]4CC5([C@H]3CC[C@@H]5C(=O)CO)CO4
- InChI: InChI=1S/C21H28O4/c1-20-7-6-13(23)8-12(20)2-3-14-15-4-5-16(17(24)10-22)21(15)9-18(19(14)20)25-11-21/h8,14-16,18-19,22H,2-7,9-11H2,1H3/t14-,15-,16+,18-,19+,20-,21?/m0/s1; Key:ZEBLTAXSHAKMDJ-QBSCYWOBSA-N

18-Deoxyaldosterone is a steroidal antimineralocorticoid with mixed agonist–antagonist but predominantly antagonistic activity at the mineralocorticoid receptor.
