= Gestrinone =

Chemical compound

Clinical data
- Trade names: Dimetriose, Dimetrose, Nemestran, others
- Other names: Ethylnorgestrienone; A-46745; R2323; R-2323; RU-2323; 17α-Ethynyl-18-methyl-δ^{9,11}-19-nortestosterone; 17α-Ethynyl-18-methylestra-4,9,11-trien-17β-ol-3-one; 13β-Ethyl-18,19-dinor-17α-pregna-4,9,11-trien-20-yn-17β-ol-3-one
- AHFS/Drugs.com: International Drug Names
- Pregnancy category: X
- Routes of administration: By mouth, vaginal
- Drug class: Progestogen; Progestin; Antiprogestogen; Androgen; Anabolic steroid; Steroidogenesis inhibitor; Antiestrogen
- ATC code: G03XA02 (WHO)

Legal status
- Legal status: BR: Class C5 (Anabolic steroids)

Pharmacokinetic data
- Protein binding: To albumin
- Metabolism: Liver (hydroxylation)
- Elimination half-life: 27.3 hours
- Excretion: Urine and bile

Identifiers
- IUPAC name: (8S,13S,14S,17R)-13-ethyl-17-ethynyl-17-hydroxy-1,2,6,7,8,14,15,16-octahydrocyclopenta[a]phenanthren-3-one
- CAS Number: 16320-04-0
- PubChem CID: 27812
- DrugBank: DB11619
- ChemSpider: 25877
- UNII: 1421533RCM
- KEGG: D04317
- ChEBI: CHEBI:89642
- ChEMBL: ChEMBL1868702
- CompTox Dashboard (EPA): DTXSID4023094
- ECHA InfoCard: 100.210.606

Chemical and physical data
- Formula: C_{21}H_{24}O_{2}
- Molar mass: 308.421 g·mol^{−1}
- 3D model (JSmol): Interactive image
- SMILES: O=C4\C=C3/C(=C2/C=C\[C@]1([C@@H](CC[C@]1(C#C)O)[C@@H]2CC3)CC)CC4
- InChI: InChI=1S/C21H24O2/c1-3-20-11-9-17-16-8-6-15(22)13-14(16)5-7-18(17)19(20)10-12-21(20,23)4-2/h2,9,11,13,18-19,23H,3,5-8,10,12H2,1H3/t18-,19+,20+,21+/m1/s1; Key:BJJXHLWLUDYTGC-ANULTFPQSA-N

Gestrinone, sold under the brand names Dimetrose and Nemestran among others, is a medication which is used in the treatment of endometriosis. It has also been used to treat other conditions such as uterine fibroids and heavy menstrual bleeding and has been investigated as a method of birth control. Gestrinone is used alone and is not formulated in combination with other medications. It is taken by mouth or in through the vagina.

Side effects of gestrinone include menstrual abnormalities, estrogen deficiency, and symptoms of masculinization like acne, seborrhea, breast shrinkage, increased hair growth, and scalp hair loss, among others. Gestrinone has a complex mechanism of action, and is characterized as a mixed progestogen and antiprogestogen, a weak androgen and anabolic steroid, a weak antigonadotropin, a weak steroidogenesis inhibitor, and a functional antiestrogen.

Gestrinone was introduced for medical use in 1986. It has been used extensively in Europe but appears to remains marketed only in a few countries throughout the world. The medication is not available in the United States. Due to its anabolic effects, the use of gestrinone in competition has been banned by the International Olympic Committee.

== Medical uses ==
Gestrinone is approved for and used in the treatment of endometriosis. It is described as similar in action and effect to danazol, which is also used in the treatment of endometriosis, but is reported to have fewer androgenic side effects in comparison. Gestrinone has also been used to shrink uterine fibroids and to reduce menorrhagia.

Due to its antigonadotropic effects and ability to inhibit ovulation, gestrinone has been studied as a method of hormonal birth control in women. Large studies across thousands of menstrual cycles have found it to be effective in preventing pregnancy. However, although effective, the pregnancy rate in the largest study conducted was 4.6 per 100 woman-years, which is too high of a failure rate for the medication to be recommended as a safe method of birth control. The medication has also been investigated as an emergency post-coital contraceptive.

== Contraindications ==
The medication is contraindicated in pregnancy, during lactation, and in patients with severe cardiac, chronic kidney disease or liver disease. It is also contraindicated in patients who experienced metabolic and/or vascular disorders during previous estrogen or progestogen therapy, or who are allergic to the medication. The medication is contraindicated in children.

== Side effects ==
The main side effects of gestrinone are androgenic and antiestrogenic in nature. In one study of 2.5 mg oral gestrinone twice per week in women, it caused seborrhea in 71%, acne in 65%, breast hypoplasia in 29%, hirsutism in 9%, and scalp hair loss in 9%. In another study, the rate of androgenic side effects was similarly 50%. Other androgenic side effects that have been reported include oily skin and hair, weight gain, voice deepening, and clitoral enlargement, the latter two of which as well as hirsutism may be irreversible.

Gestrinone also inhibits gonadotropin secretion and causes amenorrhea or oligomenorrhea in a high percentage of women. Similarly, circulating estradiol levels have been found to be reduced by 50%, which may result in estrogen deficiency and associated symptoms. Studies of 2.5 mg oral gestrinone twice per week have found a rate of amenorrhea of 50 to 58%, while a study of 5 mg oral gestrinone per day found a rate of amenorrhea of 100%.

It has been found that vaginal gestrinone shows fewer androgenic side effects and weight gain than oral gestrinone with equivalent effectiveness in endometriosis. Gestrinone appears to show similar effectiveness to danazol in the treatment of endometriosis but with fewer side effects, in particular androgenic side effects.

== Pharmacology ==
=== Pharmacodynamics ===
The mechanism of action of gestrinone is complex and multifaceted. It shows high affinity for the progesterone receptor (PR), as well as lower affinity for the androgen receptor (AR). The medication has mixed progestogenic and antiprogestogenic activity – that is, it is a partial agonist of the PR or a selective progesterone receptor modulator (SPRM) – and is a weak agonist of the AR, or an anabolic–androgenic steroid (AAS). Similarly to danazol, gestrinone acts as a weak antigonadotropin via activation of the PR and AR in the pituitary gland and suppresses the mid-cycle surge of luteinizing hormone (LH) and follicle-stimulating hormone (FSH) during the menstrual cycle without affecting basal levels of these hormones. It also inhibits ovarian steroidogenesis and, via activation of the AR in the liver, decreases circulating levels of sex hormone-binding globulin (SHBG), thereby resulting in increased levels of free testosterone. In addition to the PR and AR, gestrinone has been found to bind to the estrogen receptor (ER) with relatively "avid" affinity. The medication has functional antiestrogenic activity in the endometrium. Unlike danazol, gestrinone does not appear to bind to SHBG or corticosteroid-binding globulin (CBG).

Relative affinities (%) of gestrinone and related steroids
Compound	PR	AR	ER	GR	MR	SHBG	CBG
Norethisterone	155–156	43–45	<0.1	2.7–2.8	0.2	?	?
Norgestrienone	63–65	70	<0.1	11	1.8	?	?
Levonorgestrel	170	84–87	<0.1	14	0.6–0.9	?	?
Gestrinone	75–76	83–85	<0.1, 3–10	77	3.2	?	?
Notes: Values are percentages (%). Reference ligands (100%) were progesterone for the PR, testosterone for the AR, E2 for the ER, DEXA for the GR, aldosterone for the MR, DHT for SHBG, and cortisol for CBG. Sources:

=== Pharmacokinetics ===
Gestrinone is bound to albumin in the circulation. It is metabolized in the liver mainly by hydroxylation. Four hydroxylated active metabolites with reduced activity relative to gestrinone have been found to be formed. The elimination half-life of gestrinone is 27.3 hours. The medication is excreted in urine and bile.

== Chemistry ==
Gestrinone, also known as 17α-ethynyl-18-methyl-19-nor-δ^{9,11}-testosterone, as well as 17α-ethynyl-18-methylestra-4,9,11-trien-17β-ol-3-one or as 13β-ethyl-18,19-dinor-17α-pregna-4,9,11-trien-20-yn-17β-ol-3-one, is a synthetic estrane steroid and a derivative of testosterone. It is more specifically a derivative of norethisterone (17α-ethynyl-19-nortestosterone) and is a member of the gonane (18-methylestrane) subgroup of the 19-nortestosterone family of progestins. Gestrinone is the C18 methyl derivative of norgestrienone (17α-ethynyl-19-nor-δ^{9,11}-testosterone) and the δ^{9,11} analogue of levonorgestrel (17α-ethynyl-18-methyl-19-nortestosterone) and is also known as ethylnorgestrienone due to the fact that it is the C13β ethyl variant of norgestrienone. It is also the C17α ethynyl and C18 methyl derivative of the AAS trenbolone.

The androgenic properties of gestrinone are more exploited in its derivative tetrahydrogestrinone (THG; 17α-ethyl-18-methyl-δ^{9,11}-19-nortestosterone), a designer steroid which is far more potent as both an AAS and progestogen in comparison. THG was banned by the Food and Drug Administration (FDA) in 2003.

== History ==
Gestrinone was introduced for medical use in 1986.

== Society and culture ==
=== Generic names ===
Gestrinone is the generic name of the drug and its INN, USAN, BAN, and JAN. It is also known by its developmental code names A-46745 and R-2323 (or RU-2323).

=== Brand names ===
Gestrinone is or has been marketed under the brand names Dimetriose, Dimetrose, Dinone, Gestrin, and Nemestran.

=== Availability ===
Gestrinone is or has been marketed in Europe, Australia, Latin America, and Southeast Asia, though notably not in the United States.
