= Deprodone =

Chemical compound

Clinical data
- Other names: Desolone; 21-Desoxyprednisolone; 11β,17α-Dihydroxypregna-1,4-diene-3,20-dione
- Drug class: Corticosteroid; Glucocorticoid

Identifiers
- IUPAC name: (8S,9S,10R,11S,13S,14S,17R)-17-Acetyl-11,17-dihydroxy-10,13-dimethyl-7,8,9,11,12,14,15,16-octahydro-6H-cyclopenta[a]phenanthren-3-one
- CAS Number: 20423-99-8
- PubChem CID: 10969997
- ChemSpider: 9145207
- UNII: Z380L7N00P
- ChEMBL: ChEMBL2105540
- CompTox Dashboard (EPA): DTXSID101043210
- ECHA InfoCard: 100.039.811

Chemical and physical data
- Formula: C_{21}H_{28}O_{4}
- Molar mass: 344.451 g·mol^{−1}
- 3D model (JSmol): Interactive image
- SMILES: CC(=O)[C@]1(CC[C@@H]2[C@@]1(C[C@@H]([C@H]3[C@H]2CCC4=CC(=O)C=C[C@]34C)O)C)O
- InChI: InChI=1S/C21H28O4/c1-12(22)21(25)9-7-16-15-5-4-13-10-14(23)6-8-19(13,2)18(15)17(24)11-20(16,21)3/h6,8,10,15-18,24-25H,4-5,7,9,11H2,1-3H3/t15-,16-,17-,18+,19-,20-,21-/m0/s1; Key:KQZSMOGWYFPKCH-UJPCIWJBSA-N

Deprodone, also known as desolone, is a synthetic glucocorticoid corticosteroid.
