= Tosagestin =

Chemical compound

Clinical data
- Other names: ORG-30659; Exogestin; Letogestin; 11-Methylene-δ^{15}-norethisterone; 17α-Ethynyl-11-methylene-19-nor-δ^{15}-testosterone
- Routes of administration: By mouth

Identifiers
- IUPAC name: (1S,2R,10R,11S,14R,15S)-14-ethynyl-14-hydroxy-15-methyl-17-methylidenetetracyclo[8.7.0.0^{2,7}.0^{11,15}]heptadeca-6,12-dien-5-one
- CAS Number: 110072-15-6
- PubChem CID: 159355
- ChemSpider: 140146
- UNII: YS7Z529O22
- KEGG: D06197
- ChEMBL: ChEMBL2107658
- CompTox Dashboard (EPA): DTXSID50891344

Chemical and physical data
- Formula: C_{21}H_{24}O_{2}
- Molar mass: 308.421 g·mol^{−1}
- 3D model (JSmol): Interactive image
- SMILES: CC12CC(=C)C3C(C1C=CC2(C#C)O)CCC4=CC(=O)CCC34
- InChI: InChI=1S/C21H24O2/c1-4-21(23)10-9-18-17-7-5-14-11-15(22)6-8-16(14)19(17)13(2)12-20(18,21)3/h1,9-11,16-19,23H,2,5-8,12H2,3H3/t16-,17-,18-,19+,20-,21-/m0/s1; Key:YJSTYQGZKJHXLN-OLGWUGKESA-N

Tosagestin (INN, USAN) (developmental code name ORG-30659), also known as 11-methylene-δ^{15}-norethisterone or 17α-ethynyl-11-methylene-19-nor-δ^{15}-testosterone, is a progestin of the 19-nortestosterone group which was under development by Organon in the United States and Europe as a hormonal contraceptive (in combination with ethinylestradiol) and for the treatment of menopausal symptoms but was never marketed.

== See also ==
- Gestodene
