= Glutamine—pyruvate transaminase =

Glutamine-pyruvate transaminase

Identifiers
- EC no.: 2.6.1.15
- CAS no.: 9030-44-8

Databases
- BRENDA: enzyme data
- ExPASy: NiceZyme view
- KEGG: enzyme entry
- MetaCyc: metabolic pathway
- Rhea: reactions
- PDB structures: RCSB PDB PDBe PDBsum
- Gene Ontology: AmiGO / QuickGO
Search
- PMC: articles
- PubMed: articles
- NCBI: proteins

glutamine-pyruvate transaminase (EC 2.6.1.15) is an enzyme that catalyzes the chemical reaction

L-glutamine
+
pyruvic acid
2-oxoglutaramic acid
+
L-alanine

The two substrates of this enzyme characterised from rat liver are L-glutamine and pyruvic acid. Its products are 2-oxoglutaramic acid and L-alanine.

This enzyme is a transferase, specifically a transaminase, which transfer nitrogenous groups. The systematic name of this enzyme class is L-glutamine:pyruvate aminotransferase. Other names in common use include glutaminase II, L-glutamine transaminase L, and glutamine-oxo-acid transaminase. It uses pyridoxal phosphate as a cofactor.

== Structural studies ==
As of late 2007, 3 structures have been solved for this class of enzymes, with PDB accession codes PDB: 1V2D, PDB: 1V2E, and PDB: 1V2F.
