= Deoxycorticosterone =

Deoxycorticosterone (DOC), or desoxycorticosterone, may refer to:

- 11-Deoxycorticosterone (21-hydroxyprogesterone)
- 21-Deoxycorticosterone (11β-hydroxyprogesterone)

== See also ==
- Deoxycortisol
- Deoxycortisone
- 11-Hydroxyprogesterone
