= 21-Deoxycortisol =

Names
- IUPAC name 11β,17α-Dihydroxypregn-4-ene-3,20-dione
- Systematic IUPAC name (1R,3aS,3bS,9aR,9bS,10S,11aS)-1-Acetyl-1,10-dihydroxy-9a,11a-dimethyl-1,2,3,3a,3b,4,5,8,9,9a,9b,10,11,11a-tetradecahydro-7H-cyclopenta[a]phenanthren-7-one
- Other names 21-Desoxycortisol; 21-Dehydrohydrocortisone; 21-Deoxyhydrocortisone; 11β,17α-Dihydroxyprogesterone

Identifiers
| CAS Number | 641-77-0 |
| 3D model (JSmol) | Interactive image |
| ChEBI | CHEBI:28697 |
| ChEMBL | ChEMBL1527439 |
| ChemSpider | 83796 |
| KEGG | C05497 |
| PubChem CID | 92827 |
| UNII | XZ1JYU14MZ |
| CompTox Dashboard (EPA) | DTXSID101044501 |
- InChI: InChI=1S/C21H30O4/c1-12(22)21(25)9-7-16-15-5-4-13-10-14(23)6-8-19(13,2)18(15)17(24)11-20(16,21)3/h10,15-18,24-25H,4-9,11H2,1-3H3/t15-,16-,17-,18+,19-,20-,21-/m0/s1 Key: LCZBQMKVFQNSJR-UJPCIWJBSA-N
- SMILES: CC(=O)[C@]1(CC[C@@H]2[C@@]1(C[C@@H]([C@H]3[C@H]2CCC4=CC(=O)CC[C@]34C)O)C)O

Properties
| Chemical formula | C_{21}H_{30}O_{4} |
| Molar mass | 346.467 g/mol |
- Except where otherwise noted, data are given for materials in their standard state (at 25 °C [77 °F], 100 kPa). Infobox references

21-Deoxycortisol, also known as 11β,17α-dihydroxyprogesterone or as 11β,17α-dihydroxypregn-4-ene-3,20-dione, is a naturally occurring, endogenous steroid related to cortisol (11β,17α,21-trihydroxyprogesterone) which is formed as a metabolite from 17α-hydroxyprogesterone via 11β-hydroxylase.

== Marker of 21-hydroxylase deficiency ==
21-deoxycortisol is a marker of congenital adrenal hyperplasia due to 21-hydroxylase deficiency, even in mild (non-classic) cases. It can be also used for newborn screening.

The deficiency of the 21-hydroxylase enzyme leads to excess of 17α-hydroxyprogesterone, a 21-carbon (C_{21}) steroid. This excess is accompanied by the accumulation of other C_{21} steroids, such as 21-deoxycortisol, which is formed by the 11β-hydroxylation of 17α-hydroxyprogesterone via 11β-hydroxylase (CYP11B1). The build-up of 21-deoxycortisol in patients with congenital adrenal hyperplasia have been described since at least 1955, this steroid was then called "21-desoxyhydrocortisone". Unlike 17α-hydroxyprogesterone, 21-deoxycortisol is not produced in the gonads and is uniquely adrenal-derived. Hence, 21-deoxycortisol is a more specific biomarker of 21-hydroxylase deficiency than is 17α-hydroxyprogesterone.

The corticosteroid activity of 21-deoxycortisol is lower than that of cortisol.

As 21-deoxycortisol can be at high levels in congenital adrenal hyperplasia, and it has structural similarity to cortisol, it can cross-react in immunoassays, resulting in a falsely normal or high cortisol result, when the true cortisol is actually low. Whereas immunoassays can suffer from cross-reactivity due to interactions with structural analogues, the selectivity offered by liquid chromatography-tandem mass spectrometry (LC-MS/MS) has largely overcome these limitations. Hence, the use of LC-MS/MS instead of immunoassays in cortisol measurement aims to provide greater specificity.

Besides 21-deoxycortisol, another C_{21} steroid, 21-deoxycorticosterone (11β-hydroxyprogesterone), has been proposed as a marker for 21-hydroxylase deficiency, but this marker did not gain acceptance due to the fact that testing for the levels of this steroid is not routinely offered by diagnostic laboratories.

== See also ==
- 21-Deoxycortisone
- 11β-Hydroxyprogesterone
- 11-Deoxycortisol
- Corticosterone
- 11-Deoxycorticosterone
- Cortisone
