= Deoxycortisol =

Deoxycortisol may refer to:

- 11-Deoxycortisol (cortodoxone, cortexolone, Reichstein's Substance; 17α,21-dihydroxyprogesterone)
- 17-Deoxycortisol (corticosterone; 11β,21-dihydroxyprogesterone)
- 21-Deoxycortisol (11β,17α-dihydroxyprogesterone)

== See also ==
- Cortisol (hydrocortisone)
- Deoxycorticosterone
- Deoxycortisone
