= 11-Dehydrocorticosterone =

Names
- IUPAC name 21-Hydroxypregn-4-ene-3,11,20-trione
- Systematic IUPAC name (1S,3aS,3bS,9aR,9bS,11aS)-1-(Hydroxyacetyl)-9a,11a-dimethyl-2,3,3a,3b,4,5,8,9,9a,9b,11,11a-dodecahydro-1H-cyclopenta[a]phenanthrene-7,10-dione
- Other names 11-DHC; 11-Oxocorticosterone; 17-Deoxycortisone

Identifiers
CAS Number	72-23-1
3D model (JSmol)	Interactive image
ChEBI	CHEBI:78600
ChEMBL	ChEMBL3244489
ChemSpider	4470861
ECHA InfoCard	100.000.706
PubChem CID	5311364
UNII	FO4V44A3G3
CompTox Dashboard (EPA)	DTXSID40861617
- InChI: InChI=1S/C21H28O4/c1-20-8-7-13(23)9-12(20)3-4-14-15-5-6-16(18(25)11-22)21(15,2)10-17(24)19(14)20/h9,14-16,19,22H,3-8,10-11H2,1-2H3/t14-,15-,16+,19+,20-,21-/m0/s1 Key: FUFLCEKSBBHCMO-KJQYFISQSA-N
- SMILES: C[C@]12CCC(=O)C=C1CC[C@@H]3[C@@H]2C(=O)C[C@]4([C@H]3CC[C@@H]4C(=O)CO)C

Properties
Chemical formula	C_{21}H_{28}O_{4}
Molar mass	344.451 g/mol
- Except where otherwise noted, data are given for materials in their standard state (at 25 °C [77 °F], 100 kPa). Infobox references

11-Dehydrocorticosterone (11-DHC), also known as 11-oxocorticosterone or 17-deoxycortisone, as well as 21-hydroxypregn-4-ene-3,11,20-trione, is a naturally occurring, endogenous corticosteroid related to cortisone and corticosterone. It is a potent mineralocorticoid, with generally greater such activity than that of corticosterone.

== See also ==
- 21-Deoxycortisone
- 11-Ketoprogesterone
- 11-Deoxycorticosterone
