= 21-Deoxycortisone =

Names
- IUPAC name 17α-Hydroxypregn-4-ene-3,11,20-trione
- Systematic IUPAC name (1R,3aS,3bS,9aR,9bS,11aS)-1-Acetyl-1-hydroxy-9a,11a-dimethyl-2,3,3a,3b,4,5,8,9,9a,9b,11,11a-dodecahydro-1H-cyclopenta[a]phenanthrene-7,10-dione
- Other names 21-Desoxycortisone; 11-Keto-17α-hydroxyprogesterone; 17α-Hydroxy-11-ketoprogesterone

Identifiers
CAS Number	1882-82-2
3D model (JSmol)	Interactive image
ChemSpider	92310
ECHA InfoCard	100.015.947
KEGG	C14478
PubChem CID	102178
UNII	60A688J7YQ
CompTox Dashboard (EPA)	DTXSID70172167
- InChI: InChI=1S/C21H28O4/c1-12(22)21(25)9-7-16-15-5-4-13-10-14(23)6-8-19(13,2)18(15)17(24)11-20(16,21)3/h10,15-16,18,25H,4-9,11H2,1-3H3/t15-,16-,18+,19-,20-,21-/m0/s1 Key: PUKLDDOGISCFCP-JSQCKWNTSA-N
- SMILES: CC(=O)[C@]1(CC[C@@H]2[C@@]1(CC(=O)[C@H]3[C@H]2CCC4=CC(=O)CC[C@]34C)C)O

Properties
Chemical formula	C_{21}H_{28}O_{4}
Molar mass	344.451 g·mol^{−1}
- Except where otherwise noted, data are given for materials in their standard state (at 25 °C [77 °F], 100 kPa). Infobox references

21-Deoxycortisone, also known as 21-desoxycortisone, 11-keto-17α-hydroxyprogesterone, or 17α-hydroxypregn-4-ene-3,11,20-trione, is a naturally occurring, endogenous steroid and minor intermediate and metabolite in corticosteroid metabolism. It is related to 21-deoxycortisol (11β,17α-dihydroxyprogesterone) and is reversibly formed from it by 11β-hydroxysteroid dehydrogenase, analogously to the reversible formation of cortisone from cortisol. 21-Deoxycortisone can be transformed into cortisone by 21-hydroxylase.

== See also ==
- 11-Dehydrocorticosterone
- 11-Ketoprogesterone
- 17α-Hydroxyprogesterone
