= 11β-Hydroxyprogesterone =

Names
- IUPAC name 11β-Hydroxypregn-4-ene-3,20-dione
- Systematic IUPAC name (1S,3aS,3bS,9aR,9bS,10S,11aS)-1-Acetyl-10-hydroxy-9a,11a-dimethyl-1,2,3,3a,3b,4,5,8,9,9a,9b,10,11,11a-tetradecahydro-7H-cyclopenta[a]phenanthren-7-one
- Other names 11β-OHP; 21-Deoxycorticosterone; 21-Desoxycorticosterone

Identifiers
CAS Number	600-57-7
3D model (JSmol)	Interactive image
ChEBI	CHEBI:28247
ChEMBL	ChEMBL2440888
ChemSpider	91968
ECHA InfoCard	100.009.088
KEGG	C05498
PubChem CID	101788
CompTox Dashboard (EPA)	DTXSID701044492
- InChI: InChI=1S/C21H30O3/c1-12(22)16-6-7-17-15-5-4-13-10-14(23)8-9-20(13,2)19(15)18(24)11-21(16,17)3/h10,15-19,24H,4-9,11H2,1-3H3/t15-,16+,17-,18-,19+,20-,21+/m0/s1 Key: BFZHCUBIASXHPK-ATWVFEABSA-N
- SMILES: CC(=O)[C@H]1CC[C@@H]2[C@@]1(C[C@@H]([C@H]3[C@H]2CCC4=CC(=O)CC[C@]34C)O)C

Properties
Chemical formula	C_{21}H_{30}O_{3}
Molar mass	330.468 g/mol
- Except where otherwise noted, data are given for materials in their standard state (at 25 °C [77 °F], 100 kPa). Infobox references

11β-Hydroxyprogesterone (11β-OHP), also known as 21-deoxycorticosterone, as well as 11β-hydroxypregn-4-ene-3,20-dione, is a naturally occurring, endogenous steroid and derivative of progesterone. It is a potent mineralocorticoid. Syntheses of 11β-OHP from progesterone is catalyzed by the steroid 11β-hydroxylase (CYP11B1) enzyme, and, to a lesser extent, by the aldosterone synthase enzyme (CYP11B2).

== Function ==
Along with its epimer 11α-hydroxyprogesterone (11α-OHP), 11β-OHP has been identified as a very potent competitive inhibitor of both isoforms (1 and 2) of 11β-hydroxysteroid dehydrogenase (11β-HSD).

== Outcome of 21-hydroxylase deficiency ==
The steroid 11β-OHP has been known since 1987 to occur at increased levels in 21-hydroxylase deficiency. A study in 2017 has shown that in subjects with 21-hydroxylase deficiency, serum 11β-OHP concentrations range from 0.012 to 3.37 ng/mL, while in control group it was below detection limit of 0.012 ng/mL. 21-hydroxylase is an enzyme that is also involved in progesterone metabolism, producing 11-deoxycorticosterone. In normal conditions, 21-hydroxylase has higher activity on progesterone than steroid 11β-hydroxylase (CYP11B1) and aldosterone synthase (CYP11B2) that convert progesterone to 11β-OHP. That's why in 21-hydroxylase deficiency, given the normal function of the CYP11B enzymes, the progesterone is directed towards 11β-OHP pathway rather than towards 11-deoxycorticosterone pathway, that is also usually accompanied by an increase in progesterone levels. In the normal route to aldosterone and cortisol, progesterone and 17α-hydroxyprogesterone are first hydroxylated at position 21 and then hydroxylated at other positions. In 21-hydroxylase deficiency, progesterone and 17α-hydroxyprogesterone accumulate and are the substrates of steroid 11β-hydroxylase, leading to 1β-OHP and 21-deoxycortisol, respectively. In the 2017 study mentioned above, serum progesterone concentrations in boys (10 days to 18 years old) with 21-hydroxylase deficiency reached levels similar to female luteal values (up to 10.14 ng/mL, depending on severity and treatment), while in the control group of boys progesterone was 0.07 ng/mL (0.22 nmol/L) on average, ranged from 0.05 to 0.40 ng/mL.

In a 2016 study, classical CAH patients receiving glucocorticoid therapy had C_{19} 11-oxygenated steroid serum levels that were elevated 3-4 fold compared to healthy controls. In that same study, the levels of C_{19} 11-oxygenated androgens correlated positively with conventional androgens in women but negatively in men. The levels of 11KT were four times higher than that of T in women with the condition. In adult women with CAH, the ratio of DHT produced in a backdoor pathway to that produced in a conventional pathway increases as control of androgen excess by glucocorticoid therapy deteriorates. In CAH patients with poor disease control, 11-oxygenated androgens remain elevated for longer than 17OHP, thus serving as a better biomarker for the effectiveness of the disease control. In males with CAH, 11-oxygenated androgen levels may indicate the presence testicular adrenal rest tumors.

While studies suggest that 11β-OHP, also known as 21-deoxycorticosterone, can be used as marker for adrenal 21-hydroxylase deficiency, another 21-carbon steroid — 21-deoxycortisol (produced from 17α-hydroxyprogesterone) gained acceptance for this purpose.

== See also ==
- 21-Deoxycortisol (11β,17α-dihydroxyprogesterone)
- 11-Deoxycorticosterone (21-hydroxyprogesterone)
- Corticosterone (11β,21-dihydroxyprogesterone)
- Cortisol (11β,17α,21-trihydroxyprogesterone)
- 11-Deoxycortisol (17α,21-dihydroxyprogesterone)
- 9α-Bromo-11-ketoprogesterone
