= Retrone =

Retrone may refer to:

- Retrone (river), a tributary of the Bacchiglione
- Retrone, trade name of Dydrogesterone
