= C24H34O4 =

The molecular formula C_{24}H_{34}O_{4} may refer to:

- Algestone acetonide
- Bufalin
- Medroxyprogesterone acetate
- Proligestone
