= DHD =

DHD may refer to:

- Dima Halam Daogah, an armed militant group in Assam, India
- Deadline Hollywood Daily, an online magazine about the entertainment industry
- Digital High Definition or HD DVD, a discontinued high-density optical disc format
- Dial-Home Device, technology from the science-fiction TV series Stargate SG-1 used to tell the Stargate which planet to lock on to
- Dihydrodydrogesterone, a progestogen and metabolite of dydrogesterone
