= Estradiol enantate/algestone acetophenide =

Pharmaceutical combination

Estradiol enantate / algestone acetophenide
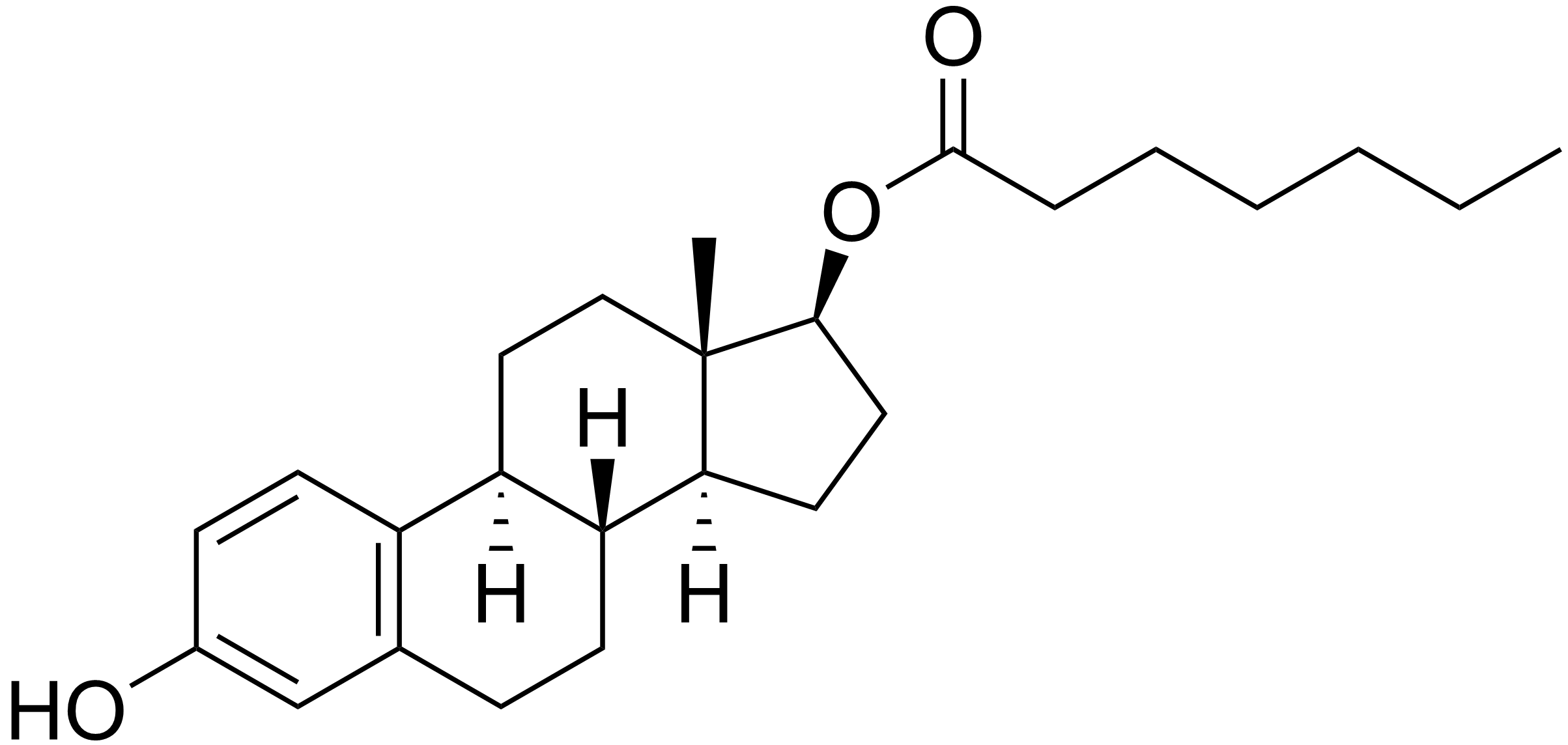

- Estradiol enantate (top) and algestone acetophenide (bottom)

Combination of
- Estradiol enantate: Estrogen
- Algestone acetophenide: Progestogen

Clinical data
- Trade names: Perlutal, Topasel, Unalmes, Yectames, many others
- Other names: Estradiol enantate/dihydroxyprogesterone acetophenide; E2-EN/DHPA
- Routes of administration: Intramuscular injection

Identifiers
- CAS Number: 4956-37-0; 24356-94-3
- PubChem CID: 91824751
- UNII: PAP315WZIA; OL7KC2O3OT

Estradiol enantate/algestone acetophenide, also known as estradiol enantate/dihydroxyprogesterone acetophenide (E2-EN/DHPA) and sold under the brand names Perlutal and Topasel among others, is a form of combined injectable birth control which is used to prevent pregnancy. It contains estradiol enantate (E2-EN), an estrogen, and algestone acetophenide (dihydroxyprogesterone acetophenide; DHPA), a progestin. The medication is given once a month by injection into muscle.

E2-EN/DHPA is used widely throughout Latin America, is also marketed in Hong Kong, and was previously available in Portugal and Spain as well but was discontinued in these countries.

== Medical uses ==
E2-EN/DHPA is used in combination as a once-monthly combined injectable contraceptive to prevent pregnancy in women in Latin America and Hong Kong. E2-EN/DHPA is used as a form of feminizing hormone therapy for travestis and trans women in South America.

=== Available forms ===
The following forms of E2-EN/DHPA are or have been available for use:

- E2-EN 10 mg and DHPA 150 mg (brand names Perlutal, Topasel, many others)
- E2-EN 5 mg and DHPA 75 mg (brand names Anafertin, Patector NF, Yectames)
- E2-EN 10 mg and DHPA 120 mg (brand names Unalmes, Yectuna)
- E2-EN 10 mg and DHPA 75 mg (brand name Ova Repos; discontinued)

A 6 mg E2-EN and 90 mg DHPA formulation was also studied, but was never marketed. The combination of E2-EN and DHPA has also been studied at other doses ranging from 5 to 50 mg E2-EN and 75 to 200 mg DHPA.

== Pharmacology ==
=== Pharmacology ===
Clinical studies have found that, on the basis of endometrial changes, E2-EN/DHPA appears, at the doses used, to be an estrogen-dominant combination.

=== Pharmacokinetics ===
By intramuscular injection, the elimination half-life of E2-EN has been found to be 5.6 to 7.5 days, while the half-life of algestone acetophenide and its metabolites has been found to be 24 days. Following a single injection, E2-EN and DHPA are detectable in the circulation for up to 30 to 60 days.

== History ==
E2-EN/DHPA was first studied as a combined injectable contraceptive in 1964. It was developed by Squibb under the developmental code name and tentative brand name Deladroxate for potential use as a combined injectable contraceptive in the United States. Due to toxicological findings of DHPA of pituitary hyperplasia in rats, mammary tumors in beagle dogs, and "uterine swellings" in animals, as well as concerns about possible accumulation of DHPA, Squibb discontinued the development of E2-EN/DHPA in the late 1960s. Subsequently, in 1973, a pharmacokinetic study of E2-EN/DHPA in women generated concerns about potential accumulation of E2-EN with once-monthly use as well. In spite of these concerns however, no toxicity or tumorigenicity has been observed with E2-EN/DHPA in humans in extensive clinical studies, and there are doubts about the relevance of the animal findings to humans. In addition, only very limited accumulation of E2-EN has been found to occur with the preparation.

Manufacturers in other countries, including EuroPharma, Farmitalia, and Promeco, resumed development of E2-EN/DHPA following the discontinuation of its development by Squibb, and introduced it for clinical use as a combined injectable contraceptive, under the brand names Perlutal and Topasel, in Spain and Latin America in the 1970s. It was one of only two combined injectable contraceptives to have been marketed by 1976, and was one of only three combined injectable contraceptives with considerable clinical experience by 1976. The others were estradiol valerate/hydroxyprogesterone caproate (EV/OHPC; brand name Injectable No. 1), which had been marketed in China, and estradiol cypionate/medroxyprogesterone acetate (EC/MPA; code name Cyclo-Provera), which was still experimental by 1976 and did not become formally available for clinical use until the 1990s. By 1994, at which point EC/MPA (brand names Cyclofem and later Lunelle) and estradiol valerate/norethisterone enantate (EV/NETE; brand name Mesigyna) had been introduced, E2-EN/DHPA had been in use for many years.

E2-EN/DHPA and EV/OHPC have been referred to as first-generation combined injectable contraceptives, while EC/MPA and EV/NETE have been referred to as second-generation combined injectable contraceptives.

== Society and culture ==
=== Brand names ===
E2-EN has been marketed under a wide variety of brand names. It has been marketed in a few different preparations, with varying doses of E2-EN and DHPA. These formulations all have different brand names, which include the following (^{†} = discontinued):

- E2-EN 10 mg / DHPA 150 mg: Acefil, Agurin^{†}, Atrimon^{†}, Ciclomes, Ciclovar, Ciclovular, Cicnor^{†}, Clinomin, Cycloven, Daiva, Damix, Deprans, Deproxone, Exuna, Ginestest, Ginoplan^{†}, Gynomes, Horprotal, Listen, Luvonal, Neogestar, Neolutin, Nomagest, Nonestrol, Normagest, Normensil, Novular, Oterol, Ovoginal, Patector, Patectro, Perludil, Perlumes, Perlutal, Perlutale, Perlutan, Perlutin, Perlutin-Unifarma, Permisil, Preg-Less, Pregnolan, Progestrol^{†}, Protegin, Proter, Seguralmes, Synovular, Topasel, Unigalen, Uno-Ciclo, and Vagital.
- E2-EN 10 mg / DHPA 120 mg: Anafertin^{†}, Patector NF, and Yectames.
- E2-EN 5 mg / DHPA 75 mg: Unalmes and Yectuna.
- E2-EN 10 mg / DHPA 75 mg: Ova Repos^{†}.
- Unsorted: Evitas^{†}, Femineo^{†}, and Primyfar^{†}.

The combination of E2-EN 10 mg and DHPA 150 mg was developed under the developmental brand name Deladroxate, but this brand name was never used commercially.

=== Availability ===
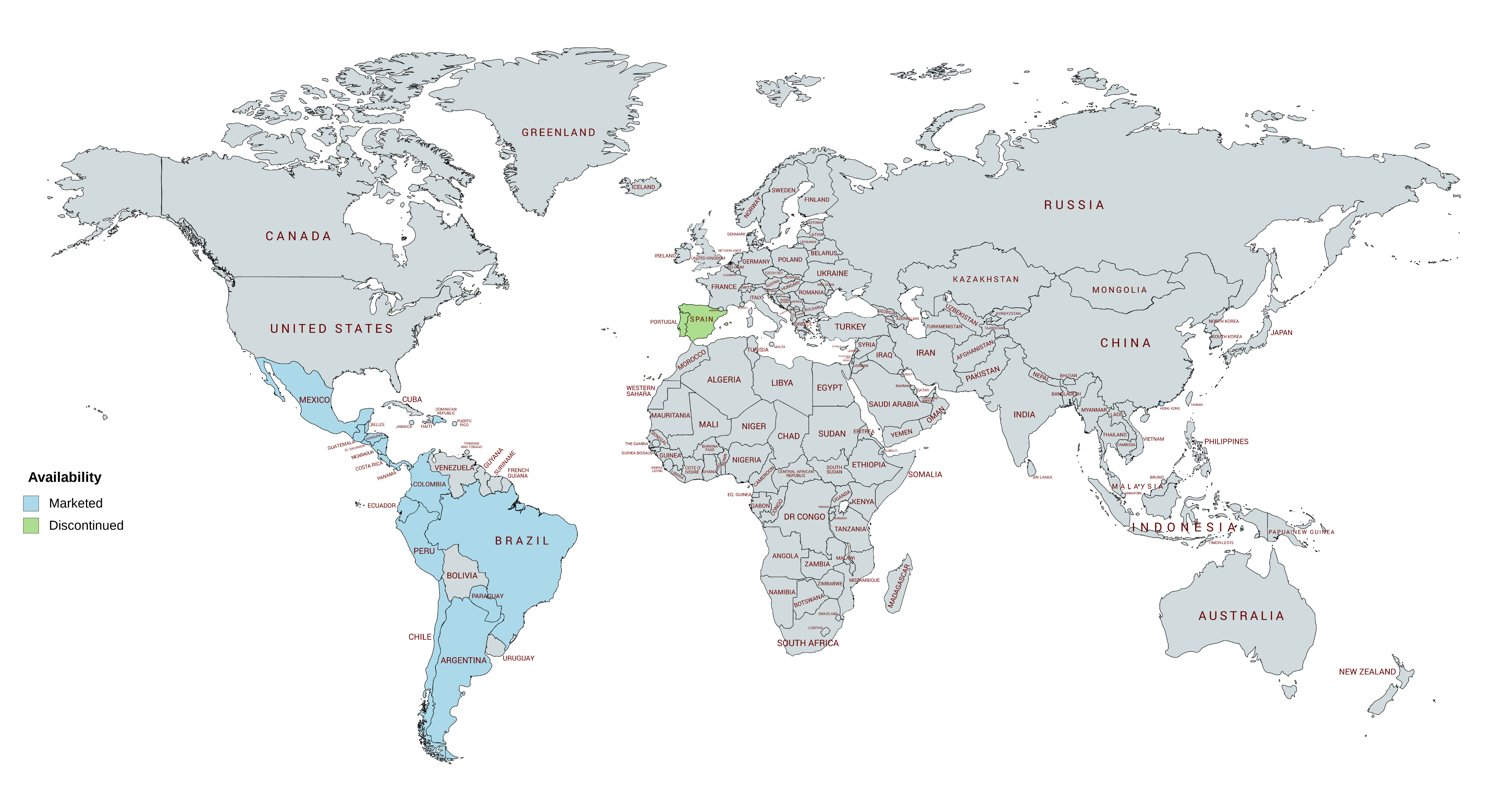
Known availability of E2-EN/DHPA in countries throughout the world (as of September 2018).

DHPA has been marketed in combination with estradiol enantate (E2-EN) as a combined injectable contraceptive in at least 19 countries, mostly in Latin America. A few different preparations, with varying doses of E2-EN and DHPA and varying availability, have been introduced. These formulations have the following approval and availability (^{†} = discontinued in this country):

- E2-EN 10 mg / DHPA 150 mg: at least 19 countries, including Argentina, Belize, Brazil, Chile, Colombia, Costa Rica, the Dominican Republic, Ecuador, El Salvador, Guatemala, Honduras, Hong Kong, Mexico, Nicaragua, Panama, Paraguay, Peru, Portugal^{†}, and Spain^{†}.
- E2-EN 10 mg / DHPA 120 mg: at least 3 countries, including Brazil^{†}, Chile, and Paraguay.
- E2-EN 5 mg / DHPA 75 mg: at least 9 countries, including Costa Rica, the Dominican Republic, El Salvador, Guatemala, Honduras, Mexico, Nicaragua, Panama, and Spain^{†}.

=== Usage ===
E2-EN/DHPA is the most widely used combined injectable contraceptive in Latin America. It was estimated in 1995 that E2-EN/DHPA was used as a combined injectable contraceptive in Latin America by at least 1 million women. However, combined injectable contraceptives like E2-EN/DHPA are unlikely to constitute a large proportion of contraceptive use in the countries in which they are available.

== See also ==
- Combined injectable birth control § Available forms
- Estradiol benzoate butyrate/algestone acetophenide
- List of combined sex-hormonal preparations
