= Dydrogesterone =

Chemical compound

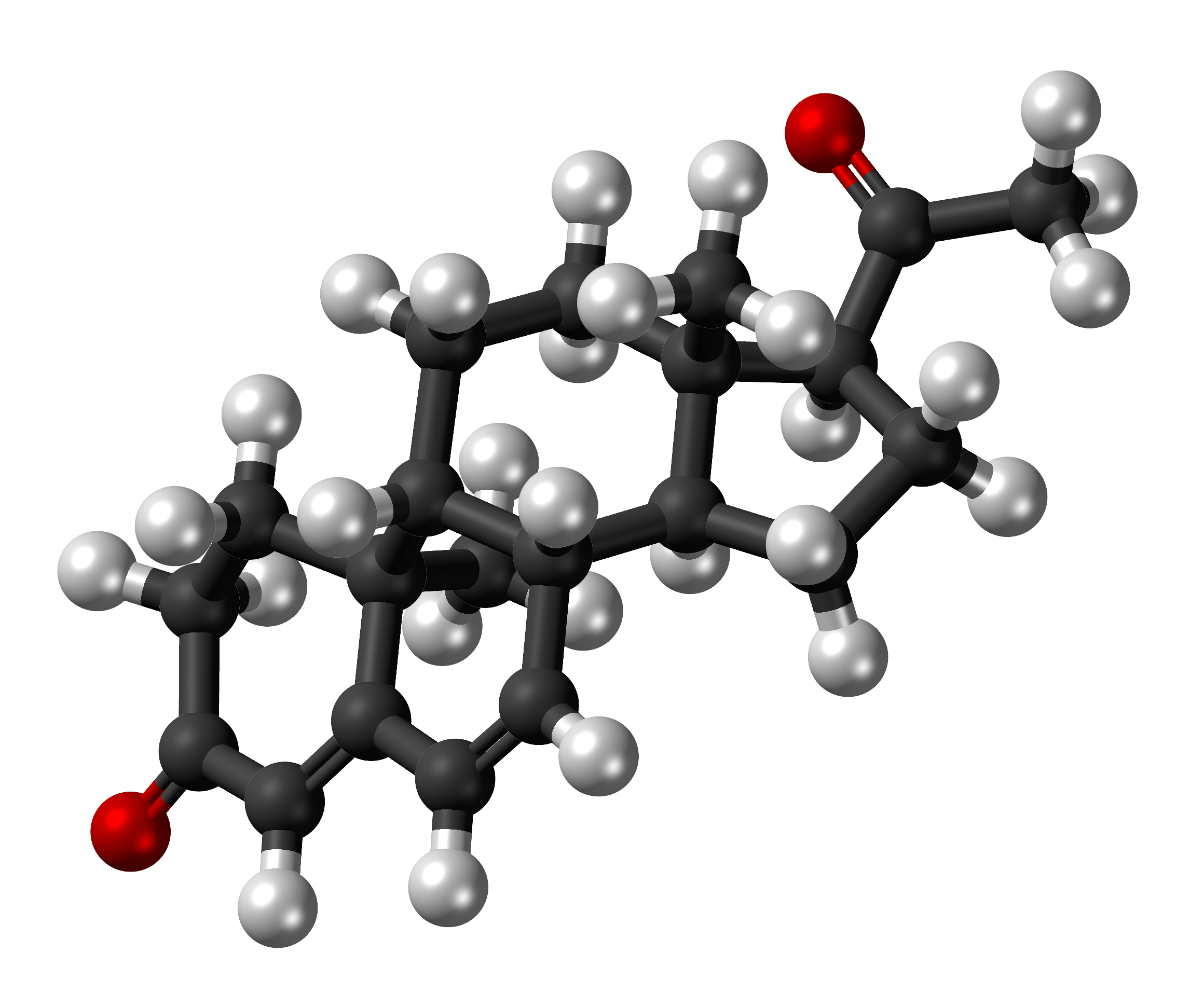

Clinical data
- Trade names: Duphaston, others
- Other names: Isopregnenone; Dehydroprogesterone; Didrogesteron; 6-Dehydroretroprogesterone; 9β,10α-Pregna-4,6-diene-3,20-dione; NSC-92336
- AHFS/Drugs.com: International Drug Names
- Routes of administration: By mouth
- Drug class: Progestogen; Progestin
- ATC code: G03DB01 (WHO)

Legal status
- Legal status: In general: ℞ (Prescription only)

Pharmacokinetic data
- Bioavailability: 28%
- Protein binding: ? (probably to albumin)
- Metabolism: Hepatic: AKR1C1, AKR1C3, CYP3A4
- Metabolites: 20α-DHD (exclusively via AKR1C1 and AKRC13)
- Elimination half-life: Parent: 5–7 hours Metabolite: 14–17 hours
- Excretion: Urine

Identifiers
- IUPAC name: (8S,9R,10S,13S,14S,17S)-17-acetyl-10,13-dimethyl-1,2,8,9,11,12,14,15,16,17-decahydrocyclopenta[a]phenanthren-3-one
- CAS Number: 152-62-5
- PubChem CID: 9051
- DrugBank: DB00378
- ChemSpider: 8699
- UNII: 90I02KLE8K
- KEGG: D01217
- ChEBI: CHEBI:31527
- CompTox Dashboard (EPA): DTXSID1022974
- ECHA InfoCard: 100.005.280

Chemical and physical data
- Formula: C_{21}H_{28}O_{2}
- Molar mass: 312.453 g·mol^{−1}
- 3D model (JSmol): Interactive image
- Melting point: 144 °C (291 °F)
- Boiling point: 463 °C (865 °F)
- Solubility in water: Insoluble mg/mL (20 °C)
- SMILES: O=C4\C=C3\C=C/[C@@H]1[C@@H](CC[C@@]2([C@@H](C(=O)C)CC[C@@H]12)C)[C@]3(C)CC4
- InChI: InChI=1S/C21H28O2/c1-13(22)17-6-7-18-16-5-4-14-12-15(23)8-10-20(14,2)19(16)9-11-21(17,18)3/h4-5,12,16-19H,6-11H2,1-3H3/t16-,17+,18-,19+,20+,21+/m0/s1; Key:JGMOKGBVKVMRFX-HQZYFCCVSA-N

Dydrogesterone, sold under the brand name Duphaston among others, is a progestin medication which is used for a variety of indications, including threatened or recurrent miscarriage during pregnancy, dysfunctional bleeding, infertility due to luteal insufficiency, dysmenorrhea, endometriosis, secondary amenorrhea, irregular cycles, premenstrual syndrome, and as a component of menopausal hormone therapy. It is taken by mouth.

Side effects of dydrogesterone include menstrual irregularities, headache, nausea, breast tenderness, and others. Dydrogesterone is a progestin, or a synthetic progestogen, and hence is an agonist of the progesterone receptor, the biological target of progestogens like progesterone. The medication is an atypical progestogen and does not inhibit ovulation. It has weak antimineralocorticoid activity and no other important hormonal activity.

Dydrogesterone was developed in the 1950s and introduced for medical use in 1961. It is available widely throughout Europe, no longer available in the United Kingdom, since 2008 and is also marketed in Australia and elsewhere in the world. The medication was previously available in the United States, but it has been discontinued in that country.

== Medical uses ==
Dydrogesterone has proven effective in a variety of conditions associated with progesterone deficiency, Infertility due to luteal insufficiency including threatened miscarriage, habitual or recurrent miscarriage, Menstrual disorders premenstrual syndrome, and endometriosis. Dydrogesterone has also been registered as a component of menopausal hormone therapy to counteract the effects of unopposed estrogen on the endometrium in persons with an intact uterus.

=== Gynecological disorders ===
Primary or essential dysmenorrhea is a very common gynecological phenomenon experienced by women during their reproductive years. Clinical studies have shown symptom relief and a reduction in pain with dydrogesterone treatment for dysmenorrhea. Secondary amenorrhea is not a specific disease, but is instead a symptom. Dydrogesterone has been found to adequately induce bleeding within a sufficiently estrogen-primed endometrium. When estradiol levels are found to be low, dydrogesterone treatment is more effective when supplemented with estrogens.

Endometriosis is a chronic disease which can cause severe, progressive, and at times, incapacitating dysmenorrhea, pelvic pain, dyspareunia and infertility. Dydrogesterone relieves pain without inhibiting ovulation, so that patients are able to become pregnant during treatment. Dydrogesterone is particularly suitable in cases where the woman desires to become pregnant and to prevent bleeding problems. Dydrogesterone results in statistically significant reductions in the symptoms pelvic pain, dysmenorrhea and dyspareunia after the first treatment cycle for the treatment of post-laparoscopic endometriosis. The amount and duration of menstrual bleeding is also significantly reduced, and from the end of the third month onwards, bleeding was considered normal in the majority of patients. Improvement of endometriosis was observed in 71% of patients.

Dydrogesterone has shown reasonable efficacy in relieving a number of premenstrual syndrome symptoms like mood swings and physical symptoms. Cyclic treatment with low-dose (10 mg/day) dydrogesterone has been found to be effective in the treatment of fibrocystic breast changes and associated breast pain.

=== Infertility and miscarriage ===
Oral dydrogesterone is an effective medication, well tolerated and accepted among patients, and can be considered for routine luteal support. Advantage of dydrogesterone is oral administration, easy to use and better patient compliance which results in high satisfaction score of oral dydrogesterone in luteal support of IVF/ICSI cycles. Oral administration of progestins dydrogesterone at least similar live birth rate than vaginal progesterone capsules when used for luteal support in embryo transfer, with no evidence of increased risk of miscarriage.

Threatened miscarriage is defined as bleeding during the first 20 weeks of pregnancy while the cervix is closed. It is the most common complication in pregnancy, occurring in 20% of all pregnancies. Recurrent abortion is defined as the loss of three or more consecutive pregnancies. Dydrogesterone is associated with approximately two-fold significant reduction in the miscarriage rate as compared to standard care in threatened and recurrent miscarriages with minimal side effects.

=== Hormone therapy ===
The objective behind menopausal hormone therapy is to actively increase the circulating levels of estrogen to control hot flashes and to prevent the long-term effects of the menopause, such as bone resorption and unfavourable changes in blood lipids. The administration of estradiol halts, or reverses atrophic changes that occur due to the loss of endogenous estradiol during the menopause.

Estrogen promotes endometrial cell growth and in postmenopausal women with an intact uterus, estrogen monotherapy results in continued endometrial development without the physiological secretory changes normally brought on by progesterone. This action is associated with an increased incidence of endometrial hyperplasia and carcinoma. Additional protection with progestogens is therefore important in patients with an intact uterus who receive estrogen therapy. Dydrogesterone counters the proliferative effect of estrogens on the endometrium and ensures the transition to a secretory pattern and cyclical shedding of the endometrium in serial menopausal hormone therapy regimes. Dydrogesterone effectively protects against the ontogenesis of endometrial hyperplasia. Unlike androgenic progestogens, dydrogesterone does not reverse the benefits brought on by estradiol on lipid profiles and carbohydrate metabolism. In a continuous, combined menopausal hormone therapy regimen, dydrogesterone retards the proliferation of the endometrium so that it remains atrophic or inactive.

=== Available forms ===
Dydrogesterone is available in the form of 10 mg oral tablets both alone and in combination with estradiol.

== Side effects ==
The most commonly reported medication-related adverse reactions in people taking dydrogesterone without an estrogen in clinical trials of indications have included menstrual irregularities, headaches, migraines, nausea, breast tenderness, bloating, and weight gain. The use of progestins, in particular medroxyprogesterone acetate, in treating postmenopausal symptoms have been associated with increased risk of blood clots and breast cancer in a study carried out by the Women's Health Initiative. While the study did not involve dydrogesterone, it is possible, but not certain, that it too increases these risks.

Dydrogesterone has been prescribed and used in over 10 million pregnancies worldwide. There have been no harmful effects exhibited due to the use of dydrogesterone while pregnant. Dydrogesterone is safe to use during pregnancy only when prescribed and indicated by a medical practitioner. Studies have not shown any incidence of decreased fertility due to dydrogesterone at therapeutic dose. The Ames test found no evidence of any potential mutagenic or toxicity properties.

Risk of breast cancer with menopausal hormone therapy in large observational studies (Mirkin, 2018)
| Study | Therapy | Hazard ratio (95% CI) |
|---|---|---|
| E3N-EPIC: Fournier et al. (2005) | Estrogen alone | 1.1 (0.8–1.6) |
| E3N-EPIC: Fournier et al. (2005) | Estrogen plus progesterone Transdermal estrogen Oral estrogen | 0.9 (0.7–1.2); 0.9 (0.7–1.2); No events |
| E3N-EPIC: Fournier et al. (2005) | Estrogen plus progestin Transdermal estrogen Oral estrogen | 1.4 (1.2–1.7); 1.4 (1.2–1.7); 1.5 (1.1–1.9) |
| E3N-EPIC: Fournier et al. (2008) | Oral estrogen alone | 1.32 (0.76–2.29) |
| E3N-EPIC: Fournier et al. (2008) | Oral estrogen plus progestogen Progesterone; Dydrogesterone; Medrogestone; Chlormadinone acetate Cyproterone acetate Promegestone; Nomegestrol acetate Norethisterone acetate Medroxyprogesterone acetate | Not analyzed^{a} 0.77 (0.36–1.62); 2.74 (1.42–5.29); 2.02 (1.00–4.06); 2.57 (1.81–3.65); 1.62 (0.94–2.82); 1.10 (0.55–2.21); 2.11 (1.56–2.86); 1.48 (1.02–2.16) |
| E3N-EPIC: Fournier et al. (2008) | Transdermal estrogen alone | 1.28 (0.98–1.69) |
| E3N-EPIC: Fournier et al. (2008) | Transdermal estrogen plus progestogen Progesterone; Dydrogesterone; Medrogestone; Chlormadinone acetate Cyproterone acetate Promegestone; Nomegestrol acetate Norethisterone acetate Medroxyprogesterone acetate | 1.08 (0.89–1.31); 1.18 (0.95–1.48); 2.03 (1.39–2.97); 1.48 (1.05–2.09); Not analyzed^{a} 1.52 (1.19–1.96); 1.60 (1.28–2.01); Not analyzed^{a} Not analyzed^{a} |
| E3N-EPIC: Fournier et al. (2014) | Estrogen alone | 1.17 (0.99–1.38) |
| E3N-EPIC: Fournier et al. (2014) | Estrogen plus progesterone or dydrogesterone | 1.22 (1.11–1.35) |
| E3N-EPIC: Fournier et al. (2014) | Estrogen plus progestin | 1.87 (1.71–2.04) |
| CECILE: Cordina-Duverger et al. (2013) | Estrogen alone | 1.19 (0.69–2.04) |
| CECILE: Cordina-Duverger et al. (2013) | Estrogen plus progestogen Progesterone; Progestins; Progesterone derivatives Testosterone derivatives | 1.33 (0.92–1.92); 0.80 (0.44–1.43); 1.72 (1.11–2.65); 1.57 (0.99–2.49); 3.35 (1.07–10.4) |
Footnotes: ^{a} = Not analyzed, fewer than 5 cases. Sources: See template.

Risk of breast cancer with menopausal hormone therapy by duration in large observational studies (Mirkin, 2018)
| Study | Therapy | Hazard ratio (95% CI) |
|---|---|---|
| E3N-EPIC: Fournier et al. (2005)^{a} | Transdermal estrogen plus progesterone <2 years 2–4 years ≥4 years | 0.9 (0.6–1.4); 0.7 (0.4–1.2); 1.2 (0.7–2.0) |
| E3N-EPIC: Fournier et al. (2005)^{a} | Transdermal estrogen plus progestin <2 years 2–4 years ≥4 years | 1.6 (1.3–2.0); 1.4 (1.0–1.8); 1.2 (0.8–1.7) |
| E3N-EPIC: Fournier et al. (2005)^{a} | Oral estrogen plus progestin <2 years 2–4 years ≥4 years | 1.2 (0.9–1.8); 1.6 (1.1–2.3); 1.9 (1.2–3.2) |
| E3N-EPIC: Fournier et al. (2008) | Estrogen plus progesterone <2 years 2–4 years 4–6 years ≥6 years | 0.71 (0.44–1.14); 0.95 (0.67–1.36); 1.26 (0.87–1.82); 1.22 (0.89–1.67) |
| E3N-EPIC: Fournier et al. (2008) | Estrogen plus dydrogesterone <2 years 2–4 years 4–6 years ≥6 years | 0.84 (0.51–1.38); 1.16 (0.79–1.71); 1.28 (0.83–1.99); 1.32 (0.93–1.86) |
| E3N-EPIC: Fournier et al. (2008) | Estrogen plus other progestogens <2 years 2–4 years 4–6 years ≥6 years | 1.36 (1.07–1.72); 1.59 (1.30–1.94); 1.79 (1.44–2.23); 1.95 (1.62–2.35) |
| E3N-EPIC: Fournier et al. (2014) | Estrogens plus progesterone or dydrogesterone <5 years ≥5 years | 1.13 (0.99–1.29); 1.31 (1.15–1.48) |
| E3N-EPIC: Fournier et al. (2014) | Estrogen plus other progestogens <5 years ≥5 years | 1.70 (1.50–1.91); 2.02 (1.81–2.26) |
Footnotes: ^{a} = Oral estrogen plus progesterone was not analyzed because there was a low number of women who used this therapy. Sources: See template.

== Overdose ==
There is not enough clinical data to support overdose in humans. The maximum dose of dydrogesterone administered to humans to date was 360 mg orally, and the medication was found to be well tolerated at this dose. There are no antidotes to overdose, and treatment should be based on symptoms. In acute toxicity trials, the LD_{50} doses in rats were in excess of 4,640 mg/kg orally.

== Interactions ==
In menopausal hormone therapy, dydrogesterone is administered together with an estrogen. Therefore, the interaction between dydrogesterone and estrogens has been assessed, and no clinically significant interaction has been observed.

== Pharmacology ==
=== Pharmacodynamics ===
20α-Dihydrodydrogesterone (20α-DHD), the main active form of dydrogesterone.

Dydrogesterone is a highly selective progestogen, and due to its unique structure, unlike progesterone and many other progestins, binds almost exclusively to the progesterone receptor (PR). The affinity of dydrogesterone for the PR is relatively low at about 16% of that of progesterone. However, in vivo, dydrogesterone is comparatively much more potent by the oral route, with an equivalent dose, in terms of endometrial proliferation, that is 10 to 20 times lower than that of progesterone. This is due to pharmacokinetic differences between the two medications, namely improved bioavailability and metabolic stability with dydrogesterone as well as additional progestogenic activity of its metabolites. Dydrogesterone binds to and activates both of the major isoforms of the PR, the PR-A and PR-B, with a similar selectivity ratio between the two receptors as that of progesterone and with lower efficacy at the receptors relative to progesterone. The major active metabolite of dydrogesterone, 20α-dihydrodydrogesterone (20α-DHD), has progestogenic activity as well but with greatly decreased potency relative to dydrogesterone. As with other progestogens, dydrogesterone has functional antiestrogenic effects in certain tissues, for instance in the endometrium, and induces endometrial secretory transformation.

Dydrogesterone does not bind importantly to the androgen, estrogen, or glucocorticoid receptor. As such, it is devoid of androgenic or antiandrogenic, estrogenic or antiestrogenic, and glucocorticoid or antiglucocorticoid activity. Similarly to progesterone however, dydrogesterone binds to the mineralocorticoid receptor and possesses antimineralocorticoid activity, but only weakly so. Like other progestins but unlike progesterone, which forms sedative neurosteroid metabolites, dydrogesterone is not able to be metabolized in a similar way, and for this reason, is non-sedative. The medication and 20α-DHD do not inhibit 5α-reductase. Dydrogesterone has been found to inhibit myometrium contractility via an undefined progesterone receptor-independent mechanism in vivo in pregnant rats and in vitro in human tissue at concentrations at which progesterone and other progestogens do not.

==== Atypical progestogenic profile ====
Due to its progestogenic activity, dydrogesterone can produce antigonadotropic effects at sufficient doses in animals. However, it does not suppress secretion of the gonadotropins, luteinizing hormone (LH) and follicle-stimulating hormone (FSH), or inhibit ovulation at typical clinical dosages in humans. Oral doses of dydrogesterone of 5 to 40 mg/day on days 5 to 25 of the cycle fail to suppress ovulation (assessed by urinary pregnanediol and laparotomy), and one study found that ovulation persisted even in women treated with an oral dosage of as great as 400 mg/day (assessed by visual inspection of the ovaries). Likewise, an intramuscular injection of 100 mg dydrogesterone in microcrystalline aqueous suspension on the first to third day of the cycle did not interfere with the development of an ovulatory pattern of spontaneous uterine contractions in women. A couple of conflicting studies exist on the issue of ovulation inhibition by dydrogesterone however, with findings of partial or full inhibition of ovulation by oral dydrogesterone. This included prevention of the mid-cycle LH and FSH peaks and the luteal-phase rise in body temperature and pregnanediol excretion. Nonetheless, the overall consensus among researchers seems to be that dydrogesterone does not inhibit ovulation in women. The apparent inability of dydrogesterone to prevent ovulation is in contrast to all other clinically used progestogens except trengestone, which is closely related to dydrogesterone. Similarly to trengestone but also unlike all other clinically used progestogens, dydrogesterone does not have a hyperthermic effect in humans (i.e., it does not increase body temperature).

It has been said that the lack of ovulation inhibition and hyperthermic effect with retroprogesterone derivatives like dydrogesterone may represent a dissociation of peripheral and central progestogenic activity. However, a related retroprogesterone derivative, trengestone, likewise does not inhibit ovulation or produce a hyperthermic effect but rather has an inducing effect on ovulation.

Whereas all other assessed progestins are associated with an increased risk of breast cancer when combined with an estrogen in postmenopausal women, neither oral progesterone nor dydrogesterone are associated with a significantly increased risk of breast cancer (although the risk of breast cancer is non-significantly higher with dydrogesterone). Similarly, like oral progesterone but in contrast to other progestins, dydrogesterone does not appear to further increase the risk of venous thromboembolism when used in combination with an oral estrogen. Dydrogesterone may also provide inferior endometrial protection relative to other progestins such as medroxyprogesterone acetate and norethisterone acetate, with a significantly increased risk of endometrial cancer in combination with an estrogen with long-term therapy (>5 years).

==== Other activity ====
Dydrogesterone weakly stimulates the proliferation of MCF-7 breast cancer cells in vitro, an action that is independent of the classical PRs and is instead mediated via the progesterone receptor membrane component-1 (PGRMC1). Certain other progestins are also active in this assay, whereas progesterone acts neutrally. It is unclear if these findings may explain the different risks of breast cancer observed with progesterone, dydrogesterone, and other progestins such as medroxyprogesterone acetate and norethisterone in clinical studies.

=== Pharmacokinetics ===
==== Absorption ====
Dydrogesterone and its major metabolite, 20α-DHD, have predictable pharmacokinetics. The single-dose kinetics are linear in the oral dose range of 2.5 to 10 mg. The pharmacokinetics do not change during repeated administration of up to 20 mg dydrogesterone once daily. Dydrogesterone is readily absorbed with oral administration. The absolute bioavailability of dydrogesterone is on average 28%. T_{max} values vary between 0.5 and 2.5 hours. Steady state is attained after 3 days of treatment. The levels of 20α-DHD, which is the main active metabolite, are also found to peak about 1.5 hours post-dose.

A single intramuscular injection of 100 mg dydrogesterone in microcrystalline aqueous suspension has been found to have a duration of action of 16 to 38 days in terms of clinical biological effect in the uterus in women. This was specifically the time until the onset of withdrawal bleeding in estrogen-treated amenorrheic women.

Parenteral potencies and durations of progestogens (Note: Sources:) (Note: All given by intramuscular or subcutaneous injection.)
| Compound | Form | Dose for specific uses (mg) (Note: Progesterone production during the luteal phase is ~25 (15–50) mg/day. The OID of OHPC is 250 to 500 mg/month.) | | | DOA (Note: Duration of action in days.) |
| Compound | Form | TFD (Note: Usually given for 14 days.) | POICD (Note: Usually dosed every two to three months.) | CICD (Note: Usually dosed once monthly.) | DOA |
|---|---|---|---|---|---|
| Algestone acetophenide | Oil soln. | – | – | 75–150 | 14–32 d |
| Gestonorone caproate | Oil soln. | 25–50 | – | – | 8–13 d |
| Hydroxyprogest. acetate (Note: Never marketed or approved by this route.) | Aq. susp. | 350 | – | – | 9–16 d |
| Hydroxyprogest. caproate | Oil soln. | 250–500 (Note: In divided doses (2 × 125 or 250 mg for OHPC, 10 × 20 mg for P4).) | – | 250–500 | 5–21 d |
| Medroxyprog. acetate | Aq. susp. | 50–100 | 150 | 25 | 14–50+ d |
| Megestrol acetate | Aq. susp. | – | – | 25 | >14 d |
| Norethisterone enanthate | Oil soln. | 100–200 | 200 | 50 | 11–52 d |
| Progesterone | Oil soln. | 200 | – | – | 2–6 d |
| Progesterone | Aq. soln. | ? | – | – | 1–2 d |
| Progesterone | Aq. susp. | 50–200 | – | – | 7–14 d |
Notes and sources:

==== Distribution ====
The plasma protein binding of dydrogesterone and 20α-DHD are unknown. Based on the plasma protein binding of other progestins however, they are probably bound to albumin and not to sex hormone-binding globulin or corticosteroid-binding globulin.

==== Metabolism ====
The metabolism of dydrogesterone occurs in the liver. It is virtually completely metabolized. The primary metabolic pathway is the hydrogenation of the 20-keto group mainly by AKR1C1 and to a lesser extent AKR1C3, resulting in 20α-DHD. This active metabolite is a progestogen similarly to dydrogesterone, albeit with much lower potency. With oral administration of dydrogesterone, circulating levels of 20α-DHD are substantially higher than those of dydrogesterone. The ratios of 20α-DHD to dydrogesterone in terms of peak levels and area-under-the-curve (AUC) levels have been found to be 25:1 and 40:1, respectively. For these reasons, despite the lower relative progestogenic potency of 20α-DHD, dydrogesterone may act as a prodrug of this metabolite.

The metabolism of dydrogesterone differs from progesterone. Whereas the major metabolite of progesterone is pregnanediol, the corresponding derivative of dydrogesterone, retropregnanediol, cannot be detected in urine with oral administration of dydrogesterone. All of the metabolites of dydrogesterone retain the 4,6-diene-3-one structure and are metabolically stable. As such, similarly to progesterone, dydrogesterone does not undergo aromatization.

The mean elimination half-lives of dydrogesterone and 20α-DHD are in the ranges of 5 to 7 hours and 14 to 17 hours, respectively.

==== Excretion ====
Dydrogesterone and its metabolites are excreted predominantly in urine. Total clearance of plasma is at a rate of 6.4 L/min. Within 72 hours, excretion is virtually complete. 20α-DHD is preponderantly present in the urine as a conjugate of glucuronic acid. Approximately 85% of the oral dose is successfully removed from the body within 24 hours. Around 90% of excreted material is 20α-DHD.

==== Miscellaneous ====
The pharmacokinetics of dydrogesterone have been reviewed.

== Chemistry ==
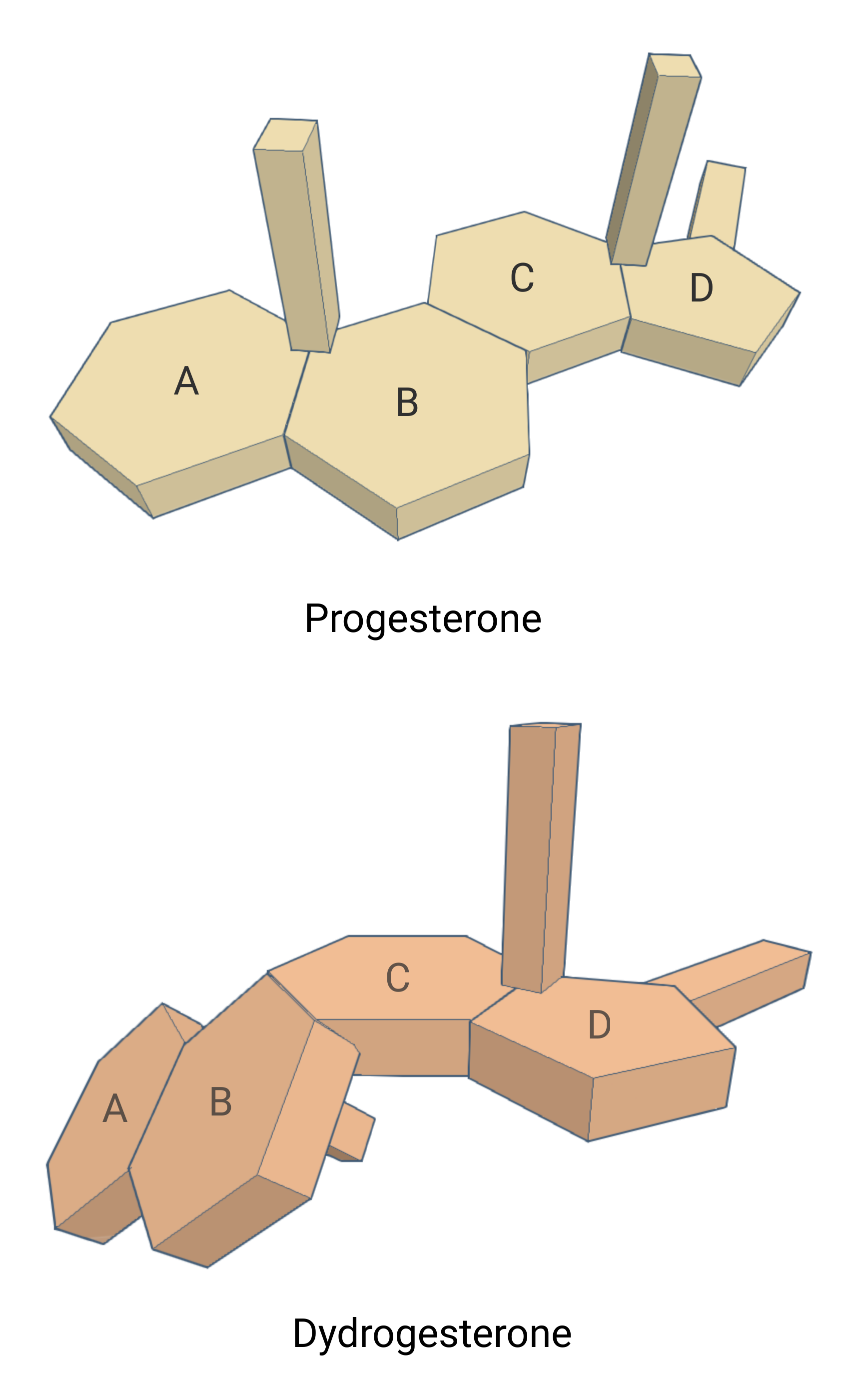
A 3D schematic representation of the chemical structures of progesterone (top) and dydrogesterone (bottom), showing the retrosteroid spatial configuration of dydrogesterone.

Dydrogesterone, also known as 6-dehydro-9β,10α-progesterone or as 9β,10α-pregna-4,6-diene-3,20-dione, is a synthetic pregnane steroid and a derivative of progesterone and retroprogesterone (9β,10α-progesterone). Retroprogesterone derivatives like dydrogesterone are analogues of progesterone in which the hydrogen atom at the 9th carbon has been switched from the α-position (below the plane) to the β-position (above the plane) and the methyl group at the 10th carbon has been switched from the β-position to the α-position. This reversed configuration in dydrogesterone results in a "bent" spatial geometry in which the plane of rings A and B is orientated at a 60° angle below the rings C and D. Dydrogesterone also has an additional double bond between the C6 and C7 positions (4,6-dien-3-one configuration). While its chemical structure is close to that of progesterone, these changes result in dydrogesterone having improved oral activity and metabolic stability, among other differences, in comparison to progesterone.

=== Analogues ===
Other retroprogesterone derivatives, and analogues of dydrogesterone, include trengestone (1,6-didehydro-6-chlororetroprogesterone) and Ro 6-3129 (16α-ethylthio-6-dehydroretroprogesterone).

=== Synthesis ===
Dydrogesterone is synthesized and manufactured by treatment of progesterone with ultraviolet light exposure.

Chemical syntheses of dydrogesterone have been published.

== History ==
Dydrogesterone is a progestin which was first synthesized by Duphar in the 1950s and was first introduced to the market in 1961. It is unique, being the only retrosteroid that is commercially available and its molecular structure is closely related to that of natural progesterone, but it has enhanced oral bioavailability. It is estimated that during the period from 1977 to 2005 around 38 million women were treated with dydrogesterone and that fetuses were exposed to dydrogesterone in utero in more than 10 million pregnancies. It has been approved in more than 100 countries worldwide. It is commercially marketed under the brand name Dydroboon and manufactured by Mankind Pharma. Dydrogesterone was first introduced, by Duphar, as Duphaston in the United Kingdom in 1961. Subsequently, it was introduced in the United States as Duphaston and Gynorest in 1962 and 1968, respectively. Duphaston was removed from the United States market in 1979, and Gynorest is also no longer available in the United States.

== Society and culture ==
=== Generic names ===
Dydrogesterone is the generic name of the drug and its INN, USAN, and BAN, while dydrogestérone is its DCF and didrogesterone is its DCIT. It was also originally known as isopregnenone. Dydrogesterone has also been referred to as retroprogesterone, but should not be confused with retroprogesterone.

=== Brand names ===
Dydrogesterone is marketed mainly under the brand names Duphaston (alone) and Femoston (in combination with estradiol). It also is or has been marketed alone under the brand names Dabroston, Divatrone, Dufaston, Duvaron, Dydrofem, Femoston, Gestatron, Gynorest, Prodel, Retrone, Terolut and Zuviston and in combination with estradiol under the brand names Climaston, Femaston, and Femphascyl.

=== Availability ===
Dydrogesterone is available widely throughout the world. It is marketed in the United Kingdom, India, Ireland, South Africa, and Australia, but not in the United States, Canada, or New Zealand. The medication was previously available in the United States, but has since been discontinued in this country. Dydrogesterone is also available in elsewhere in Europe, as well as in Central and South America, Asia, and North Africa.

== See also ==
- Estradiol/dydrogesterone
