= Trengestone =

Chemical compound

Clinical data
- Trade names: Reteroid, Retroid, Retrone
- Other names: Ro 4-8347; Triengestone; 1,6-Didehydro-6-chlororetroprogesterone; 6-Chloro-9β-10α-pregna-1,4,6-triene-3,20-dione
- Routes of administration: By mouth
- Drug class: Progestogen; Progestin
- ATC code: None

Legal status
- Legal status: In general: ℞ (Prescription only)

Pharmacokinetic data
- Bioavailability: ≥41–46% (based on urinary excretion)
- Metabolism: Liver
- Metabolites: • 20α-Dihydrotrengestone
- Elimination half-life: • Trengestone: very short • 20α-DHTG: 8–14 hours
- Excretion: Urine: 41–46% Feces: 30% (unchanged)

Identifiers
- IUPAC name: (8S,9S,10R,13S,14S,17S)-17-acetyl-6-chloro-10,13-dimethyl-8,9,11,12,14,15,16,17-octahydrocyclopenta[a]phenanthren-3-one
- CAS Number: 5192-84-7
- PubChem CID: 56840930
- ChemSpider: 28475379
- UNII: VY6S496SVX
- ChEBI: CHEBI:135458
- ChEMBL: ChEMBL2107518
- CompTox Dashboard (EPA): DTXSID101023713
- ECHA InfoCard: 100.023.617

Chemical and physical data
- Formula: C_{21}H_{25}ClO_{2}
- Molar mass: 344.88 g·mol^{−1}
- 3D model (JSmol): Interactive image
- SMILES: CC(=O)[C@H]1CC[C@@H]2[C@@]1(CC[C@H]3[C@H]2C=C(C4=CC(=O)C=C[C@]34C)Cl)C
- InChI: InChI=1S/C21H25ClO2/c1-12(23)15-4-5-16-14-11-19(22)18-10-13(24)6-8-21(18,3)17(14)7-9-20(15,16)2/h6,8,10-11,14-17H,4-5,7,9H2,1-3H3/t14-,15+,16-,17-,20+,21+/m0/s1; Key:USXVMPAWZOOYDE-HGUQNLGYSA-N

Trengestone, sold under the brand names Reteroid, Retroid, and Retrone, is a progestin medication which was formerly used to treat menstrual disorders but is now no longer marketed. It is taken by mouth.

Side effects of trengestone include headache, fatigue, and breast tenderness among others. Trengestone is a progestin, or a synthetic progestogen, and hence is an agonist of the progesterone receptor, the biological target of progestogens like progesterone. It is not androgenic or estrogenic.

Trengestone was introduced for medical use in 1974. It is no longer available.

== Medical uses ==
Trengestone was used in the treatment of menstrual disorders. It has also been used to induce ovulation, with about a 50% success rate on average.

== Side effects ==
Side effects of trengestone include headache, fatigue, and breast tenderness among others. It is not androgenic and does not cause masculinization.

== Pharmacology ==
20α-Dihydrotrengestone, the main active form of trengestone.

=== Pharmacodynamics ===
Trengestone is a progestogen, or an agonist of the progesterone receptor. It is an atypical progestogen similarly to dydrogesterone. For instance, unlike other progestogens, trengestone and dydrogesterone do not increase body temperature (i.e., have no hyperthermic effect). In addition, whereas other progestogens are antigonadotropic and inhibit ovulation, dydrogesterone is neither antigonadotropic nor progonadotropic and does not affect ovulation, and trengestone appears to be progonadotropic and can be used to induce ovulation. Similarly to dydrogesterone and progesterone, trengestone has no androgenic or estrogenic activity.

=== Pharmacokinetics ===
Trengestone appears to be a prodrug of 20α-dihydrotrengestone (20α-DHTG), as it is largely transformed into this major metabolite upon oral administration. 20α-DHTG has potent progestogenic activity, with peak levels of this metabolite occurring at 2 to 4 hours following administration of trengestone and with a biological half-life of 8 to 14 hours. Trengestone is excreted 41 to 46% in urine and up to 30% unchanged in feces, suggesting that a significant portion of the medication is not absorbed from the gastrointestinal tract. The metabolism and pharmacokinetics of trengestone have been reviewed.

== Chemistry ==
Trengestone, also known as 1,6-didehydro-6-chlororetroprogesterone or as 6-chloro-9β,10α-pregna-1,4,6-triene-3,20-dione, is a synthetic pregnane steroid and a derivative of progesterone and retroprogesterone. Retroprogesterone derivatives like trengestone are analogues of progesterone in which the hydrogen atom at the 9th carbon has been switched from the α-position (below the plane) to the β-position (above the plane) and the methyl group at the 10th carbon has been switched from the β-position to the α-position. This results in a "bent" configuration in which the plane of rings A and B is orientated at a 60° angle below the rings C and D. Analogues of trengestone include dydrogesterone (6-dehydroretroprogesterone) and Ro 6-3129 (16α-ethylthio-6-dehydroretroprogesterone).

== History ==
Trengestone was synthesized in 1964 and was introduced for medical use by Roche in 1974.

== Society and culture ==
=== Generic names ===
Trengestone is the generic name of the drug and its INN. It is also known by its former developmental code name Ro 4-8347.

=== Brand names ===
Trengestone was marketed under the brand names Reteroid, Retroid, and Retrone.

=== Availability ===
Trengestone is no longer marketed and hence is no longer available in any country.
