= 20α-Dihydrotrengestone =

Chemical compound

Clinical data
- Other names: 20α-DHTG; 20α-Hydroxytrengestone; 6-Chloro-20(S)-hydroxy-9β,10α-pregna-1,4,6-trien-3-one
- Drug class: Progestin; Progestogen

Pharmacokinetic data
- Elimination half-life: 8–14 hours

Identifiers
- CAS Number: 26136-53-8

Chemical and physical data
- Formula: C_{21}H_{26}ClO_{2}
- Molar mass: 345.89 g·mol^{−1}
- 3D model (JSmol): Interactive image
- SMILES: O([H])[C@@](C)[C@]([H])1CC[C@]([H])2[C@@]([H])3C=C(Cl)C4=CC(C=C[C@@]4(C)[C@]3([H])CC[C@@]21C)=O
- InChI: InChI=1S/C21H26ClO2/c1-12(23)15-4-5-16-14-11-19(22)18-10-13(24)6-8-21(18,3)17(14)7-9-20(15,16)2/h6,8,10-11,14-17,23H,4-5,7,9H2,1-3H3/t14-,15+,16-,17+,20+,21-/m0/s1; Key:YOKUOTGYGGEOMR-OAYGGAORSA-N

20α-Dihydrotrengestone (20α-DHTG), also known as 20α-hydroxytrengestone, as well as 6-chloro-20(S)-hydroxy-9β,10α-pregna-1,4,6-trien-3-one, is a progestin and the major active metabolite of trengestone. It appears that trengestone is a prodrug of 20α-DHTG, as it is largely transformed into this metabolite when given orally in humans. 20α-DHTG has potent progestogenic activity similarly to trengestone.

== See also ==
- 20α-Dihydrodydrogesterone
- 20α-Dihydroprogesterone
