= Luteal support =

Medication use in early pregnancy

Luteal support is the administration of medication, generally progesterone, progestins, hCG or GnRH agonists, to increase the success rate of implantation and early embryogenesis, thereby complementing and/or supporting the function of the corpus luteum. It can be combined with for example in vitro fertilization and ovulation induction.

Progesterone appears to be the best method of providing luteal phase support, with a relatively higher live birth rate than placebo, and a lower risk of ovarian hyperstimulation syndrome (OHSS) than hCG. Addition of other substances such as estrogen or hCG does not seem to improve outcomes.

== Progesterone and progestins ==
The live birth rate is significantly higher with progesterone for luteal support in IVF cycles with or without intracytoplasmic sperm injection (ICSI). Co-treatment with GnRH agonists further improves outcomes, by a live birth rate RD of +16% (95% confidence interval +10 to +22%).

=== Routes and formulations ===
There is no evidence of any route of administration of progesterone or progestins being more beneficial than others for luteal support. The main ones are:

Oral formulations for luteal support
Dydrogesterone	10 mg 3 times daily, or 20 mg twice daily.
Progesterone	200 mg, 3-4 times daily
Desogestrel	450μg once per day.

- Oral administration of progesterone or progestin pills. Oral administration of progestins provides at least similar live birth rate than vaginal progesterone capsules when used for luteal support in embryo transfer, with no evidence of increased risk of miscarriage.
- Intravaginal administration of gel, tablets or other inserts, such as endometrin. A weekly vaginal ring is an effective and safe method for intravaginal administration.
- Intramuscular administration. Daily intramuscular injections of progesterone-in-oil (PIO) have been the standard route of administration, but are not FDA-approved for use in pregnancy.

=== Time of initiation ===
The time for beginning luteal support can be put in relation to various events:

- In IVF, generally somewhere between the evening of oocyte retrieval and day 3 after oocyte retrieval, with weak evidence indicating that 2 days after oocyte retrieval may be optimal.
- In artificial insemination, luteal support is generally started on the day of insemination, or 1 to 2 days after.

=== Duration ===
Luteal support given for a shorter duration than 7 weeks results in an increased risk of miscarriage in women with a dysfunctional corpus luteum (as can be diagnosed by blood tests for endogenous progesterone). In general, however, luteal support can safely be discontinued at the time of a positive pregnancy test (approximately 2 weeks after fertilization).

== Other substances tested in luteal phase ==
The addition of estrogen or hCG as adjunctives to progesterone do not appear to affect outcomes pregnancy rate and live birth rate in IVF. In fact, luteal support with human chorionic gonadotropin (hCG) alone or as a supplement to progesterone has been associated with a higher risk of ovarian hyperstimulation syndrome (OHSS). Low molecular weight heparin as luteal support may improve the live birth rate but has substantial side effects and has no reliable data on long-term effects. Glucocorticoids such as cortisol has limited evidence of efficacy as luteal support.
