= Estradiol benzoate butyrate/algestone acetophenide =

Combination drug

Estradiol benzoate butyrate / algestone acetophenide

- Estradiol benzoate butyrate (top) and algestone acetophenide (bottom)

Combination of
- Estradiol benzoate butyrate: Estrogen
- Algestone acetophenide: Progestogen

Clinical data
- Trade names: Neolutin N, Redimen, Soluna, Unijab
- Other names: Estradiol benzoate butyrate/dihydroxyprogesterone acetophenide; EBB/DHPA; Unimens
- Routes of administration: Intramuscular injection

Estradiol benzoate butyrate/algestone acetophenide, also known as estradiol benzoate butyrate/dihydroxyprogesterone acetophenide (EBB/DHPA) and sold under the brand names Neolutin N, Redimen, Soluna, and Unijab, is a form of combined injectable birth control which is used in Peru and Singapore. It contains estradiol benzoate butyrate (EBB), an estrogen, and algestone acetophenide (dihydroxyprogesterone acetophenide; DHPA), a progestin. The medication is given once per month by injection into muscle.

== Medical uses ==
EBB/DHPA is used as a once-a-month combined injectable contraceptive to prevent pregnancy in women.

=== Available forms ===
EBB/DHPA contains 10 mg estradiol benzoate butyrate (EBB), an estrogen, and 150 mg algestone acetophenide (dihydroxyprogesterone acetophenide; DHPA), a progestin.

== Pharmacology ==
=== Pharmacodynamics ===
EBB/DHPA has been said to have relatively weak estrogenic activity and has been described as "progestogen-dominant".

=== Pharmacokinetics ===
EBB is said to have a shorter duration than estradiol enantate of about 3 weeks. EBB/DHPA was developed because it was thought that the duration of EBB would be more suitable for use as a once-monthly combined injectable contraceptive than estradiol enantate in estradiol enantate/algestone acetophenide.

== Society and culture ==
=== Brand names ===
EBB/DHPA is marketed under the brand names Neolutin N, Redimen, Soluna, and Unijab. It was originally developed under the tentative brand name Unimens, but ultimately was not marketed under this particular brand name.

=== Availability ===
EBB/DHPA is available only in Peru and Singapore.

== See also ==
- Combined injectable birth control § Available forms
- Estradiol enantate/algestone acetophenide
- List of combined sex-hormonal preparations
