= Algestone =

Chemical compound

Clinical data
- Other names: Dihydroxyprogesterone; DHP; Alfasone; Alphasone; Neo-Alfasol; 16α,17α-Dihydroxyprogesterone; 16α,17α-Dihydroxypregn-4-ene-3,20-dione; Alphasone; Alfasone
- Drug class: Progestin; Progestogen
- ATC code: None

Legal status
- Legal status: In general: ℞ (Prescription only)

Identifiers
- IUPAC name: (8R,9S,10R,13S,14S,16R,17S)-17-acetyl-16,17-dihydroxy-10,13-dimethyl-2,6,7,8,9,11,12,14,15,16-decahydro-1H-cyclopenta[a]phenanthren-3-one
- CAS Number: 595-77-7
- PubChem CID: 11687
- ChemSpider: 11196
- UNII: 3JEB53B3WT
- ChEBI: CHEBI:763
- CompTox Dashboard (EPA): DTXSID40208200
- ECHA InfoCard: 100.008.974

Chemical and physical data
- Formula: C_{21}H_{30}O_{4}
- Molar mass: 346.467 g·mol^{−1}
- 3D model (JSmol): Interactive image
- SMILES: O=C4\C=C2/[C@]([C@H]1CC[C@@]3([C@@](O)(C(=O)C)[C@H](O)C[C@H]3[C@@H]1CC2)C)(C)CC4
- InChI: InChI=1S/C21H30O4/c1-12(22)21(25)18(24)11-17-15-5-4-13-10-14(23)6-8-19(13,2)16(15)7-9-20(17,21)3/h10,15-18,24-25H,4-9,11H2,1-3H3/t15-,16+,17+,18-,19+,20+,21-/m1/s1; Key:CXDWHYOBSJTRJU-SRWWVFQWSA-N

Algestone (INN), also known as alphasone or alfasone, as well as dihydroxyprogesterone, is a progestin which was never marketed. Another progestin, algestone acetophenide, in contrast, has been marketed as a hormonal contraceptive.

== Chemistry ==
Algestone, also known as 16α,17α-dihydroxyprogesterone or as 16α,17α-dihydroxypregn-4-ene-3,20-dione, is a synthetic pregnane steroid and a derivative of progesterone and 17α-hydroxyprogesterone. Closely related analogues of algestone include 16α-hydroxyprogesterone, algestone acetonide, and algestone acetophenide.
