= 20α-Dihydrodydrogesterone =

Chemical compound

Clinical data
- Other names: 20α-DHD; 20α-Hydroxydydrogesterone; 20(S)-Hydroxy-9β,10α-pregna-4,6-dien-3-one
- Drug class: Progestin; Progestogen

Pharmacokinetic data
- Elimination half-life: 14–17 hours
- Excretion: Urine (mainly as glucuronide conjugates)

Identifiers
- IUPAC name: (8S,9R,10S,13S,14S,17S)-17-(1-Hydroxyethyl)-10,13-dimethyl-1,2,8,9,11,12,14,15,16,17-decahydrocyclopenta[a]phenanthren-3-one
- CAS Number: 4243-74-7
- PubChem CID: 6451883
- ChemSpider: 4954332
- UNII: QPF25HV8PA

Chemical and physical data
- Formula: C_{21}H_{30}O_{2}
- Molar mass: 314.469 g·mol^{−1}
- 3D model (JSmol): Interactive image
- SMILES: [H][C@@]1(CC[C@@]2([H])[C@]3([H])C=CC4=CC(=O)CC[C@]4(C)[C@]3([H])CC[C@]12C)[C@H](C)O
- InChI: InChI=1/C21H30O2/c1-13(22)17-6-7-18-16-5-4-14-12-15(23)8-10-20(14,2)19(16)9-11-21(17,18)3/h4-5,12-13,16-19,22H,6-11H2,1-3H3/t13-,16-,17+,18-,19+,20-,21+/s2; Key:IQPNZLYVKOVQGH-AIANXXHJNA-N

20α-Dihydrodydrogesterone (20α-DHD), also known as 20α-hydroxydydrogesterone, as well as 20(S)-hydroxy-9β,10α-pregna-4,6-dien-3-one, is a progestin and the major active metabolite of dydrogesterone. It appears that dydrogesterone is a prodrug of 20α-DHD, as it is largely transformed into this metabolite when given orally in humans. 20α-DHD has progestogenic activity similarly to dydrogesterone, but is far less potent in comparison.

== See also ==
- 20α-Dihydroprogesterone
- 20α-Dihydrotrengestone
