= Algestone acetophenide =

Chemical compound

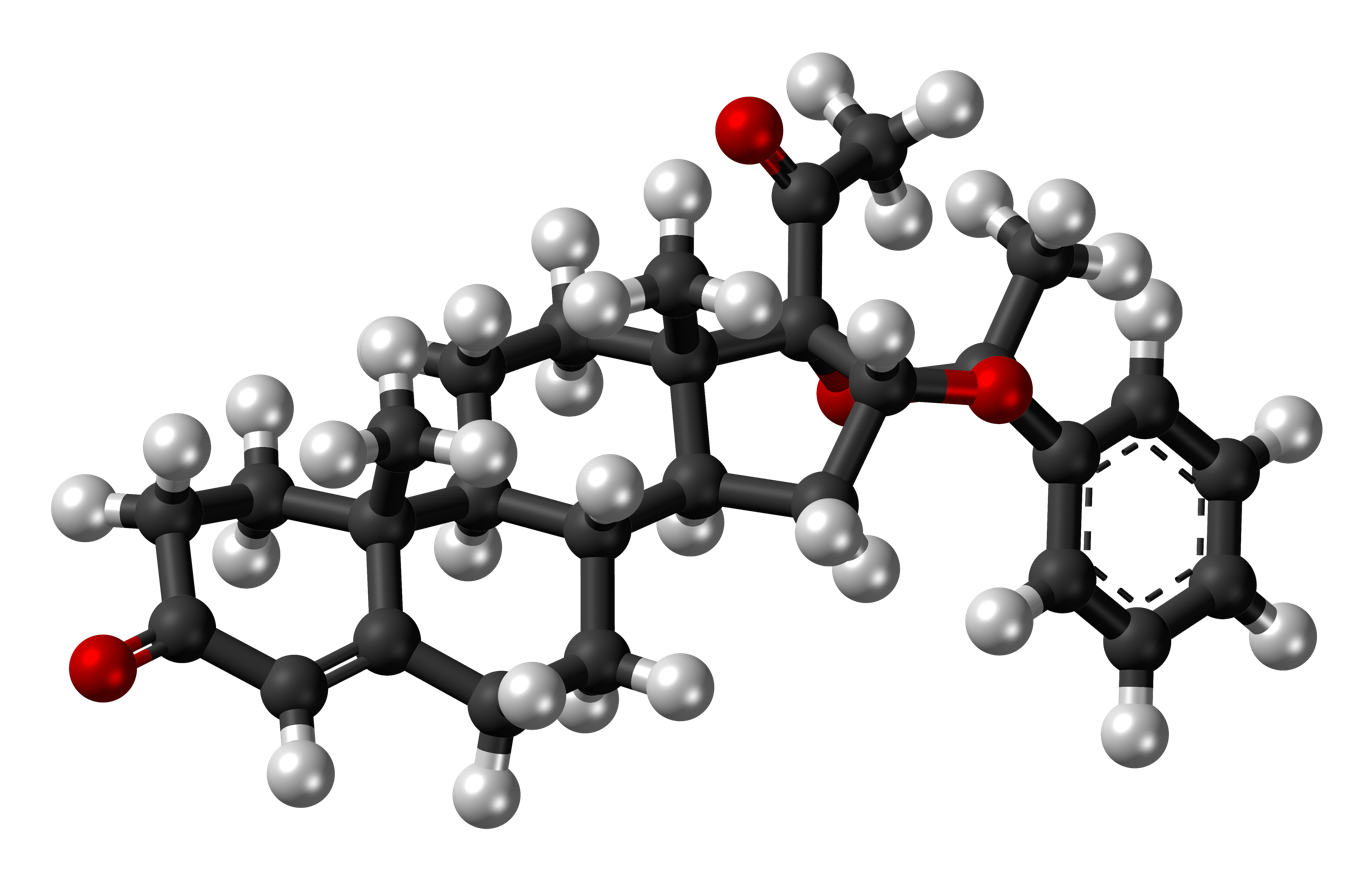

Clinical data
- Trade names: Perlutal, Topasel, Unalmes, Yectames, many others
- Other names: Dihydroxyprogesterone acetophenide; DHPA; Deladroxone; Droxone; Alfasone acetophenide; Alphasone acetophenide; SQ-15101; 16α,17α-Dihydroxyprogesterone acetophenide; 16α,17α-Dihydroxypregn-4-ene-3,20-dione cyclic acetal with acetophenone; (R)-16α,17-[(1-Phenylethylidene)dioxy]pregn-4-ene-3,20-dione
- Routes of administration: Intramuscular injection
- Drug class: Progestogen; Progestin
- ATC code: None

Pharmacokinetic data
- Elimination half-life: IM: 24 days
- Excretion: Preferentially feces

Identifiers
- IUPAC name: (4aR,4bS,6aS,6bS,8R,9aR,10aS,10bR)-6b-Acetyl-4a,6a,8-trimethyl-8-phenyl-3,4,4a,4b,5,6,6a,6b,9a,10,10a,10b,11,12-tetradecahydro-2H-naphtho[2',1':4,5]indeno[1,2-d][1,3]dioxol-2-one
- CAS Number: 24356-94-3
- PubChem CID: 5284538
- DrugBank: DB15775
- ChemSpider: 4447595
- UNII: OL7KC2O3OT
- KEGG: D02809
- ChEBI: CHEBI:49327
- ChEMBL: ChEMBL3989742
- CompTox Dashboard (EPA): DTXSID1022891
- ECHA InfoCard: 100.041.981

Chemical and physical data
- Formula: C_{29}H_{36}O_{4}
- Molar mass: 448.603 g·mol^{−1}
- 3D model (JSmol): Interactive image
- SMILES: O=C(C)[C@]25O[C@@](O[C@@H]5C[C@H]1[C@H]4[C@H](CC[C@@]12C)[C@@]3(/C(=C\C(=O)CC3)CC4)C)(c6ccccc6)C
- InChI: InChI=1S/C29H36O4/c1-18(30)29-25(32-28(4,33-29)19-8-6-5-7-9-19)17-24-22-11-10-20-16-21(31)12-14-26(20,2)23(22)13-15-27(24,29)3/h5-9,16,22-25H,10-15,17H2,1-4H3/t22-,23+,24+,25-,26+,27+,28-,29-/m1/s1; Key:AHBKIEXBQNRDNL-FVCOMRFXSA-N

Algestone acetophenide, also known more commonly as dihydroxyprogesterone acetophenide (DHPA) and sold under the brand names Perlutal and Topasel among others, is a progestin medication which is used in combination with an estrogen as a form of long-lasting injectable birth control. It has also been used alone, but is no longer available as a standalone medication. DHPA is not active by mouth and is given once a month by injection into muscle.

Side effects of DHPA are similar to those of other progestins. DHPA is a progestin, or a synthetic progestogen, and hence is an agonist of the progesterone receptor, the biological target of progestogens like progesterone. It has no other important hormonal activity.

DHPA was discovered in 1958 and was introduced for medical use in the 1960s. It was not introduced in the United States, but it is marketed widely throughout Latin America. It was also previously available alone in Italy and as a combined injectable contraceptive in Portugal and Spain, but has been discontinued in these countries.

== Medical uses ==
DHPA is used in combination with estradiol enantate (E2-EN) or estradiol benzoate butyrate (EBB) as a once-monthly combined injectable contraceptive for women in Latin America, Hong Kong, and Singapore. It was also previously marketed for use alone in Italy. DHPA has reportedly been used to treat acne. E2-EN/DHPA is used by transgender women in some places of South America as feminizing hormone therapy.

=== Available forms ===
The following forms of DHPA in combination with an estrogen are or have been available for use:

- 150 mg DHPA and 10 mg estradiol enantate (brand names Perlutal, Topasel, many others)
- 75 mg DHPA and 5 mg estradiol enantate (brand names Anafertin, Patector NF, Yectames)
- 120 mg DHPA and 10 mg estradiol enantate (brand names Unalmes, Yectuna)
- 75 mg DHPA and 10 mg estradiol enantate (brand name Ova Repos; discontinued)
- 150 mg DHPA and 10 mg estradiol benzoate butyrate (brand names Neolutin N, Redimen, Soluna, Unijab)

A 90 mg DHPA and 6 mg estradiol enantate formulation was also studied, but was never marketed. The combination of DHPA and estradiol enantate has also been studied at other doses ranging from 75 to 200 mg DHPA and 5 to 50 mg estradiol enantate.

== Side effects ==
Side effects of the combination of DHPA and estradiol enantate have reportedly included dysmenorrhea, breast tenderness, headache, edema, bloating, changes in libido, depression, anxiety, and injection site pain. The half-dose formulation of DHPA and estradiol enantate retains contraceptive effects but causes severe disruption of menstrual bleeding patterns. Likewise, the formulation of DHPA in combination with estradiol benzoate butyrate has been associated with poor control of menstrual bleeding.

== Overdose ==
DHPA has been studied at high doses of 900 mg/week by intramuscular injection in women with endometrial cancer.

== Pharmacology ==
=== Pharmacodynamics ===
DHPA is a progestogen, or an agonist of the progesterone receptor. It is said to be both more potent and longer-acting than the related progestogen hydroxyprogesterone caproate. The progestogenic potency of DHPA is about 2 to 5 times that of progesterone in animals. The medication has no androgenic, antiandrogenic, estrogenic, antiestrogenic, glucocorticoid, or antimineralocorticoid activities, and hence is a pure progestogen with no off-target activity.

Clinical studies have found that, on the basis of endometrial changes, E2-EN/DHPA appears, at the doses used, to be an estrogen-dominant combination.

An effective ovulation-inhibiting dose of DHPA is 100 mg when given alone.

Parenteral potencies and durations of progestogens (Note: Sources:) (Note: All given by intramuscular or subcutaneous injection.)
Compound	Form	Dose for specific uses (mg) (Note: Progesterone production during the luteal phase is ~25 (15–50) mg/day. The OID of OHPC is 250 to 500 mg/month.)			DOA (Note: Duration of action in days.)
Compound	Form	TFD (Note: Usually given for 14 days.)	POICD (Note: Usually dosed every two to three months.)	CICD (Note: Usually dosed once monthly.)	DOA
Algestone acetophenide	Oil soln.	–	–	75–150	14–32 d
Gestonorone caproate	Oil soln.	25–50	–	–	8–13 d
Hydroxyprogest. acetate (Note: Never marketed or approved by this route.)	Aq. susp.	350	–	–	9–16 d
Hydroxyprogest. caproate	Oil soln.	250–500 (Note: In divided doses (2 × 125 or 250 mg for OHPC, 10 × 20 mg for P4).)	–	250–500	5–21 d
Medroxyprog. acetate	Aq. susp.	50–100	150	25	14–50+ d
Megestrol acetate	Aq. susp.	–	–	25	>14 d
Norethisterone enanthate	Oil soln.	100–200	200	50	11–52 d
Progesterone	Oil soln.	200	–	–	2–6 d
Progesterone	Aq. soln.	?	–	–	1–2 d
Progesterone	Aq. susp.	50–200	–	–	7–14 d
Notes and sources:

=== Pharmacokinetics ===
The pharmacokinetics of DHPA have been studied, albeit limitedly. One study in women observed an elimination half-life of DHPA and its metabolites of 24 days and found that it remained detectable in the circulation for up to 60 days following a single intramuscular injection. In another study, the duration of action of DHPA was reported to be more than 100 days after a single subcutaneous injection, although it was unspecified as to whether this was in humans or animals. DHPA is excreted preferentially in feces via the biliary route.

== Chemistry ==
DHPA, also known as 16α,17α-dihydroxyprogesterone acetophenide, as well as 16α,17α-dihydroxypregn-4-ene-3,20-dione cyclic acetal with acetophenone or as (R)-16α,17-[(1-phenylethylidene)dioxy]pregn-4-ene-3,20-dione, is a synthetic pregnane steroid and a derivative of progesterone. It is specifically a derivative of 17α-hydroxyprogesterone with an additional hydroxyl group at the C17α position, or of algestone (16α,17α-dihydroxyprogesterone), and with the two hydroxyl groups cyclized into an acetophenide moiety (a cyclic acetal with acetophenone). Analogues of DHPA include other 17α-hydroxyprogesterone derivatives such as algestone acetonide (dihydroxyprogesterone acetonide), chlormadinone acetate, cyproterone acetate, gestonorone caproate, hydroxyprogesterone caproate, medroxyprogesterone acetate, megestrol acetate, and segesterone acetate.

=== Synthesis ===
Chemical syntheses of DHPA have been published.

== History ==
DHPA was first described in the literature in 1958 and was patented in 1960. It was developed in combination with estradiol enantate as a long-lasting combined injectable contraceptive under the tentative brand names Deladroxate and Droxone by Squibb and was studied in women starting in 1964. Development was discontinued by Squibb in the United States in the late 1960s due to concerns of toxicological findings in animals, including mammary gland tumors in beagle dogs and pituitary hyperplasia in rats, as well as possible accumulation of estradiol enantate in the body with continued use. Subsequent research has shed doubt that these animal findings are applicable to humans and that the dosages required for contraception would pose any risks. Although the medication was not marketed in the United States, its development was continued elsewhere and it went on to be introduced and widely used in Latin America and Spain. A standalone version of DHPA was introduced in Italy in 1982 under the brand names Neolutin Depo and Neolutin Depositum. This single-drug formulation has since been discontinued. DHPA remains available in Latin America, but is no longer marketed in Europe.

== Society and culture ==
=== Generic names ===
Algestone acetophenide are the English generic name of the drug and its INNM and USAN, while dihydroxyprogesterone acetophenide (DHPA) is a commonly used synonym. Its generic names in other languages are as follows:

- French: acétophénide d'algestone and dihydroxyprogestérone acétophénide
- German: algeston acetofenid and dihydroxyprogesteron acetophenid
- Italian: algestone acetofenide and diidrossiprogesterone acetofenide
- Portuguese and Spanish: acetofenido de algestona, algestona acetofenido, algestona acetofenida, acetofenido de dihidroxiprogesterona, and dihidroxiprogesterona acetofenido

DHPA is also known by its former developmental code name SQ-15101. It has been referred to as deladroxone, droxone, alfasone acetophenide, and alphasone acetophenide as well.

=== Brand names ===
DHPA has been marketed alone and in combination with estrogens under a wide variety of brand names. It was marketed alone under the brand name Neolutin Depositum, but this preparation was discontinued. The medication was developed under the developmental code names Deladroxone and Droxone, but these brand names were never used commercially. DHPA has been marketed in combination with estradiol enantate (E2-EN) as a combined injectable contraceptive in a few different preparations, with varying doses of E2-EN and DHPA. These formulations all have different brand names, which include the following (^{†} = discontinued):

- E2-EN 10 mg / DHPA 150 mg: Acefil, Agurin^{†}, Atrimon^{†}, Ciclomes, Ciclovar, Ciclovular, Cicnor^{†}, Clinomin, Cycloven, Daiva, Damix, Deprans, Deproxone, Exuna, Ginestest, Ginoplan^{†}, Gynomes, Horprotal, Listen, Luvonal, Neogestar, Neolutin, Nomagest, Nonestrol, Normagest, Normensil, Novular, Oterol, Ovoginal, Patector, Patectro, Perludil, Perlumes, Perlutal, Perlutale, Perlutan, Perlutin, Perlutin-Unifarma, Permisil, Preg-Less, Pregnolan, Progestrol^{†}, Protegin, Proter, Seguralmes, Synovular, Topasel, Unigalen, Uno-Ciclo, and Vagital.
- E2-EN 10 mg / DHPA 120 mg: Anafertin^{†}, Patector NF, and Yectames.
- E2-EN 5 mg / DHPA 75 mg: Unalmes and Yectuna.
- E2-EN 10 mg / DHPA 75 mg: Ova Repos^{†}.
- Unsorted: Evitas^{†}, Femineo^{†}, and Primyfar^{†}.

The combination of E2-EN 10 mg and DHPA 150 mg was developed under the developmental brand name Deladroxate, but this brand name was never used commercially.

In addition to E2-EN, DHPA is marketed in combination with estradiol benzoate butyrate (EBB) as a combined injectable contraceptive under the brand names Neolutin N, Redimen, Soluna, and Unijab. This combination was developed under the developmental brand name Unimens, but this brand name was never used commercially.

DHPA has also been used in veterinary medicine in cows under the brand name Bovitrol.

=== Availability ===
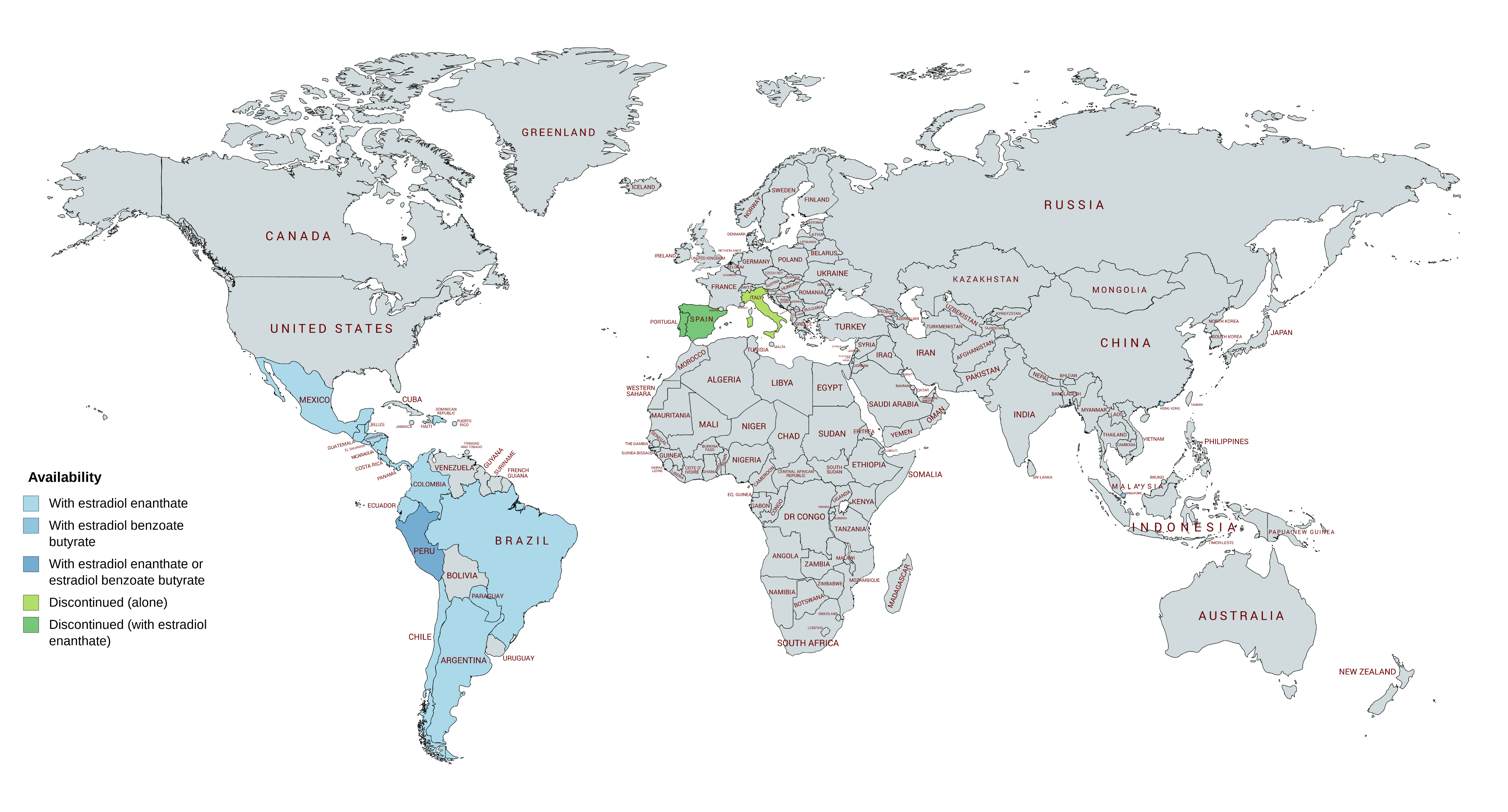
Known availability of DHPA in countries throughout the world (as of September 2018).

DHPA has been available for use both alone and in combination with estrogens. It was marketed alone under the brand name Neolutin Depositum in Italy, but this preparation was discontinued. DHPA has been marketed in combination with estradiol enantate (E2-EN) as a combined injectable contraceptive in at least 19 countries, mostly in Latin America. A few different preparations, with varying doses of E2-EN and DHPA and varying availability, have been introduced. These formulations have the following approval and availability (^{†} = discontinued in this country):

- E2-EN 10 mg / DHPA 150 mg: at least 19 countries, including Argentina, Belize, Brazil, Chile, Colombia, Costa Rica, the Dominican Republic, Ecuador, El Salvador, Guatemala, Honduras, Hong Kong, Mexico, Nicaragua, Panama, Paraguay, Peru, Portugal^{†}, and Spain^{†}.
- E2-EN 10 mg / DHPA 120 mg: at least 3 countries, including Brazil^{†}, Chile, and Paraguay.
- E2-EN 5 mg / DHPA 75 mg: at least 9 countries, including Costa Rica, the Dominican Republic, El Salvador, Guatemala, Honduras, Mexico, Nicaragua, Panama, and Spain^{†}.

In addition to E2-EN, DHPA is marketed in combination with estradiol benzoate butyrate (EBB) as a combined injectable contraceptive in Peru and Singapore. EBB has a shorter duration than E2-EN of about 3 weeks and hence EBB/DHPA was developed because it was thought that it would be more suitable for use as a once-monthly combined injectable contraceptive than E2-EN/DHPA.

=== Usage ===
E2-EN/DHPA is the most widely used combined injectable contraceptive in Latin America. It was estimated in 1995 that E2-EN/DHPA was used as a combined injectable contraceptive in Latin America by at least 1 million women. However, combined injectable contraceptives like E2-EN/DHPA are unlikely to constitute a large proportion of contraceptive use in the countries in which they are available.

== Research ==
DHPA was studied by its developer Squibb for use as a progestogen-only injectable contraceptive at a dose of 100 mg once per month by intramuscular injection under the developmental code name and tentative brand name Deladroxone. It was associated with poor cycle control and was never marketed for this indication.

== See also ==
- Estradiol enantate/algestone acetophenide
- Estradiol benzoate butyrate/algestone acetophenide
