= Algestone acetonide =

Chemical compound

Clinical data
- Other names: W-3395; Alfasone acetonide; Alphasone acetonide; Algestone 16α,17α-acetonide; 16α,17α-Isopropylidenedioxyprogesterone; 16α,17α-(Isopropylidenedioxy)pregn-4-ene-3,20-dione
- Drug class: Progestin; Progestogen

Identifiers
- IUPAC name: (1R,2S,4R,8S,9S,12S,13R)-8-acetyl-6,6,9,13-tetramethyl-5,7-dioxapentacyclo[10.8.0.0^{2,9}.0^{4,8}.0^{13,18}]icos-17-en-16-one
- CAS Number: 4968-09-6
- PubChem CID: 11740874
- ChemSpider: 9915579
- UNII: WXD8I4Y1IH
- KEGG: D02808
- ChEBI: CHEBI:49320
- ChEMBL: ChEMBL2105960
- CompTox Dashboard (EPA): DTXSID80964338
- ECHA InfoCard: 100.023.280

Chemical and physical data
- Formula: C_{24}H_{34}O_{4}
- Molar mass: 386.532 g·mol^{−1}
- 3D model (JSmol): Interactive image
- SMILES: CC(=O)[C@@]12[C@@H](C[C@@H]3[C@@]1(CC[C@H]4[C@H]3CCC5=CC(=O)CC[C@]45C)C)OC(O2)(C)C
- InChI: InChI=1S/C24H34O4/c1-14(25)24-20(27-21(2,3)28-24)13-19-17-7-6-15-12-16(26)8-10-22(15,4)18(17)9-11-23(19,24)5/h12,17-20H,6-11,13H2,1-5H3/t17-,18+,19+,20-,22+,23+,24-/m1/s1; Key:LSWBQIAZNGURQV-WTBIUSKOSA-N

Algestone acetonide (developmental code name W-3395), also known as algestone 16α,17α-acetonide or 16α,17α-isopropylidenedioxyprogesterone, is a progestin which was never marketed. It is the acetonide cyclic ketal of algestone. Another progestin, algestone acetophenide, in contrast, has been marketed.
