= EuroPharma =

EuroPharma is a multinational pharmaceutical company based in Germany.

== History ==
Established in 1990, EuroPharma emerged as a consulting firm in the healthcare sector, specializing in curriculum development, educational materials, and the administration of medical training content.

In 2017, it was acquired by Universal Medical Group.
