= List of antiandrogens =

Testosterone, the major endogenous androgen and the target mediator of antiandrogens.

This is a list of antiandrogens, or drugs that prevent the effects of androgens like testosterone and dihydrotestosterone (DHT). It includes direct antagonists of the androgen receptor (AR), androgen synthesis inhibitors like 5α-reductase inhibitors and CYP17A1 inhibitors, and antigonadotropins like GnRH analogues, estrogens, and progestogens. In addition, it includes both steroidal antiandrogen (SAAs) and nonsteroidal antiandrogen (NSAAs).

== Androgen receptor antagonists ==
=== Steroidal antiandrogens ===
Cyproterone acetate, the most widely used steroidal antiandrogen.

- 17α-Hydroxyprogesterone derivatives
  - Chlormadinone acetate
  - Cyproterone acetate
  - Megestrol acetate
  - Osaterone acetate
- 19-Norprogesterone derivatives
  - Nomegestrol acetate
- 19-Nortestosterone derivatives
  - Dienogest
  - Oxendolone
- 17α-Spirolactone derivatives
  - Drospirenone
  - Spironolactone
- Others
  - Medrogestone

Note that in addition to acting as AR antagonists, most SAAs also act as potent progestogens and therefore antigonadotropins.

Note that this list does not include pure progestogens, only SAAs also acting as AR antagonists.

=== Nonsteroidal antiandrogens ===
Bicalutamide, the most widely used nonsteroidal antiandrogen.

- First-generation
  - Bicalutamide
  - Flutamide
  - Nilutamide
- Second-generation
  - Apalutamide
  - Darolutamide
  - Enzalutamide
  - Proxalutamide
- Others/non-generational
  - Cimetidine
  - Topilutamide

Note that, in contrast to most SAAs, NSAAs are pure/selective AR antagonists with no antigonadotropic activity.

== Androgen synthesis inhibitors ==
=== CYP17A1 inhibitors ===
Abiraterone acetate, a CYP17A1 inhibitor and by extension an androgen synthesis inhibitor.

- Abiraterone acetate
- Ketoconazole
- Seviteronel

=== CYP11A1 (P450scc) inhibitors ===
- Aminoglutethimide

=== 5α-Reductase inhibitors ===
Dutasteride, a 5α-reductase inhibitor and by extension a DHT synthesis inhibitor.

- Alfatradiol
- Dutasteride
- Epristeride
- Finasteride
- Saw palmetto extract

These drugs selectively inhibit the synthesis of DHT without affecting that of testosterone.

== Antigonadotropins ==
Leuprorelin, a GnRH agonist and hence an antigonadotropin.

- Estrogens (e.g., estradiol (and its esters), ethinylestradiol, conjugated estrogens, diethylstilbestrol)
- GnRH analogues
  - GnRH agonists (e.g., goserelin, leuprorelin)
  - GnRH antagonists (e.g., cetrorelix)
- Progestogens (e.g., chlormadinone acetate, cyproterone acetate, gestonorone caproate, medroxyprogesterone acetate, megestrol acetate)

== See also ==
- List of androgens/anabolic steroids
