= Benorterone =

Chemical compound

Clinical data
- Other names: SKF-7690; FC-612; 17α-Methyl-B-nortestosterone; 17α-Methyl-B-norandrost-4-en-17β-ol-3-one
- Routes of administration: By mouth, topical
- Drug class: Steroidal antiandrogen
- ATC code: None

Identifiers
- IUPAC name: (3S,3aS,5aS,5bR,10aR,10bS)-3-hydroxy-3,3a,5b-trimethyl-1,2,4,5,5a,6,7,10,10a,10b-decahydrocyclopenta[a]fluoren-8-one
- CAS Number: 3570-10-3
- PubChem CID: 10039776
- ChemSpider: 8215340
- UNII: J339Q7IM54
- CompTox Dashboard (EPA): DTXSID701017936

Chemical and physical data
- Formula: C_{19}H_{28}O_{2}
- Molar mass: 288.431 g·mol^{−1}
- 3D model (JSmol): Interactive image
- SMILES: CC12CCC(=O)C=C1CC3C2CCC4(C3CCC4(C)O)C
- InChI: InChI=1S/C19H28O2/c1-17-7-4-13(20)10-12(17)11-14-15(17)5-8-18(2)16(14)6-9-19(18,3)21/h10,14-16,21H,4-9,11H2,1-3H3/t14-,15+,16+,17+,18+,19+/m1/s1; Key:RQETXCPBBLHUIB-UGCZWRCOSA-N

Benorterone, also known by its developmental code name SKF-7690 and as 17α-methyl-B-nortestosterone, is a steroidal antiandrogen which was studied for potential medical use but was never marketed. It was the first known antiandrogen to be studied in humans. It is taken by mouth or by application to skin.

== Pharmacology ==
=== Pharmacodynamics ===
Benorterone is an antiandrogen, or an antagonist of the androgen receptor (AR), the biological target of the androgen sex hormones testosterone and dihydrotestosterone. In one study, the affinity of benorterone for the AR was found to be about 5-fold greater than that of cyproterone acetate in rat prostate cytosol; the K_{i} values were 0.7 nM for benorterone and 3.7 nM for cyproterone acetate, which were 243% and 46% of those of testosterone (K_{i} = 1.7 nM), respectively. However, another study found that benorterone had only 11% of the affinity of dihydrotestosterone for the androgen receptor. Although an antiandrogen, benorterone actually is a very weak partial agonist of the AR and has been reported to possess weak androgenic activity. The same is true for cyproterone acetate and other steroidal antiandrogens.

Unlike certain other steroidal antiandrogens such as cyproterone acetate, benorterone is not also a progestogen, instead being described as a selective and pure AR antagonist similarly to nonsteroidal antiandrogens such as flutamide and bicalutamide. However, although it is described as not being a progestogen, benorterone was found to produce "a highly variable decrease in plasma testosterone levels," indicating that it has weak antigonadotropic effects. The reasons for this are unclear, as other pure antiandrogens such as cyproterone (not cyproterone acetate) and flutamide do not do this and instead produce consistent increases in testosterone levels. However, it is notable that the anabolic steroid methyltestosterone, which benorterone differs from in chemical structure only by the removal of a carbon atom in the B ring, is aromatized into the estrogen methylestradiol and has potent estrogenic activity. Estrogens are antigonadotropic similarly to androgens and progestogens and are likewise able to suppress testosterone levels. In accordance, the compound corresponding to what would be the aromatized form of benorterone, 17α-methyl-B-norestradiol, has been described and has been reported to possess estrogenic activity, although the aromatization of benorterone has not been assessed.

A couple of studies found that prothrombin levels decreased by 50% in some patients treated with benorterone, although a causal relationship between this change and benorterone could not be shown.

=== Pharmacokinetics ===
Benorterone is active orally and topically and has been studied by both of these routes of administration.

== Chemistry ==
Benorterone, also known as 17α-methyl-B-nortestosterone or as 17α-methyl-B-norandrost-4-en-17β-ol-3-one, is a synthetic androstane steroid and a derivative of testosterone. Specifically, it is the C17α methyl and B-nor analogue of testosterone and the B-nor analogue of methyltestosterone. Other testosterone-derived steroidal antiandrogens include abiraterone acetate, BOMT, delanterone, dienogest, galeterone, metogest, mifepristone, oxendolone, rosterolone, topterone, trimethyltrienolone, and zanoterone, while progesterone-derived steroidal antiandrogens include examples like cyproterone and cyproterone acetate.

== History ==
Benorterone was developed in the late 1950s, was first reported to possess antiandrogenic activity in 1964, and was investigated in clinical trials in the mid-to-late 1960s. It was the first known antiandrogen to be studied in humans. The drug was found to be effective in the treatment of acne, seborrhea, and hirsutism in women. In addition, unlike progestogenic antiandrogens such as cyproterone acetate, it seldom produced side effects in women and did not affect menstruation. However, in males, benorterone was not effective for acne, and produced high rates of gynecomastia (in 12 out of 13 or 92% of young men treated with 75 to 300 mg/day benorterone). Shortly following the observance of this side effect, it was withdrawn from clinical studies. Subsequently, cyproterone acetate, which has a greatly reduced risk of gynecomastia by virtue of its concomitant progestogenic and antigonadotropic actions (which results in suppression of estrogen levels), was developed instead and was introduced for medical use in 1973. In addition, spironolactone, a steroidal antimineralocorticoid that was introduced for medical use in 1959, was discovered to possess potent antiandrogenic activity in 1969, and became widely used clinically as an antiandrogen after its first use in an androgen-dependent condition in 1978.

== Society and culture ==
=== Generic names ===
Benorterone is the generic name of the drug and its INN and USAN. It is also known by its developmental code names SKF-7690 and FC-612.
