= List of steroidal antiandrogens =

Cyproterone acetate, the most well-known and widely used steroidal antiandrogen.

Steroid ring system.

This is a list of steroidal antiandrogens.

== Progesterone derivatives ==
- 11α-Hydroxyprogesterone = 11α-hydroxyprogesterone
- Chlormadinone acetate = 17α-acetoxy-6-chloro-δ^{6}-progesterone
- Clometerone (L-38000) = 6α-chloro-16α-methylprogesterone
- Cyproterone (SH-80881) = 1,2α-methylene-6-chloro-δ^{6}-17α-hydroxyprogesterone
- Cyproterone acetate = 1,2α-methylene-6-chloro-δ^{6}-17α-acetoxyprogesterone
- Edogestrone (PH-218) = 17α-acetoxy-3,3-ethylenedioxy-6-methylpregn-5-en-20-one
- Medrogestone = 6,17α-dimethyl-δ^{6}-progesterone
- Megestrol acetate = 17α-acetoxy-δ^{6}-6-methylprogesterone
- Nomegestrol acetate = 17α-acetoxy-δ^{6}-6-methyl-19-norprogesterone
- Osaterone acetate (TZP-4238) = 17α-acetoxy-6-chloro-2-oxa-δ^{6}-progesterone

== Testosterone derivatives ==
- Abiraterone (CB-7598) = 17-(3-pyridinyl)androsta-5,16-dien-3β-ol
- Abiraterone acetate = 17-(3-pyridinyl)androsta-5,16-dien-3β-ol acetate
- Benorterone (SKF-7690, FC-612) = 17α-methyl-B-nortestosterone
- BOMT (Ro 7-2340) = 6α-bromo-4-oxa-17α-methyl-4,5α-dihydrotestosterone
- Delanterone (GBR-21162) = 17β-dehydroxy-1α-methyl-δ^{16}-testosterone
- Dienogest = 17α-cyanomethyl-19-nor-δ^{9(10)}-testosterone
- Epitestosterone = 17α-epitestosterone
- Galeterone (TOK-001, VN/124-1) = 17-(1H-benzimidazol-1-yl)androsta-5,16-dien-3β-ol
- Metogest (SC-14207) = 16,16-dimethyl-19-nortestosterone
- Mifepristone = 11β-[p-(dimethylamino)phenyl]-17-(1-propynyl)-δ^{9}-19-nortestosterone
- Oxendolone (TSAA-291) = 16β-ethyl-19-nortestosterone
- Rosterolone (SH-434, 17α-propylmesterolone) = 1α-methyl-17α-propyl-4,5α-dihydrotestosterone
- Topterone (WIN-17665) = 17α-propyltestosterone
- Trimethyltrienolone (R-2956, RU-2956) = 2α,2β,17α-trimethyl-19-nor-δ^{9,11}-testosterone
- Zanoterone (WIN-49596) = (5α,17α)-1'-(methylsulfonyl)-1'-H-pregn-20-yno[3,2-c]pyrazol-17-ol

== Spirolactone derivatives ==
- SC-5233 (spirolactone) = 17α-(2-carboxyethyl)testosterone γ-lactone
- SC-8109 = 19-norspirolactone
- Canrenone (aldadiene) = Δ^{6}-spirolactone
- Dicirenone (SC-26304) = 7α-carboxyisopropylspirolactone
- Drospirenone = 6β,7β:15β,16β-dimethylenespirolactone
- Mespirenone (ZK-94679) = Δ^{1}-7α-acetylthio-15β,16β-methylenespirolactone
- Mexrenone (ZK-32055, SC-25152) = 7α-(methoxycarbonyl)spirolactone
- Prorenone (SC-23133) = 6α,7α-methylenespirolactone
- Spironolactone = 7α-acetylthiospirolactone
- Spirorenone (ZK-35973) = Δ^{1}-6β,7β:15β,16β-dimethylenespirolactone
- Spiroxasone = 7α-acetylthiospirolactone with the ketone group removed from the C17α spirolactone ring

== Cortisol derivatives ==
- 9,11-Dehydrocortexolone 17α-butyrate (CB-03-04) = 17α-(butyryloxy)-9,11-didehydrodeoxycorticosterone
- Clascoterone (CB-03-01; cortexolone 17α-propionate, 11-deoxycortisol 17α-propionate) = 17α-(propionyloxy)deoxycorticosterone

== Others ==
- Guggulsterone = pregna-4,17-diene-3,16-dione
- Nordinone = 11α-hydroxy-17,17-dimethyl-18-norandrosta-4,13-dien-3-one

== See also ==
- List of steroids
