= Inocoterone =

Chemical compound

Clinical data
- Other names: RU-29294; 2,5-Seco-A-dinorestr-9-en-17β-ol-5-one
- Routes of administration: Topical
- Drug class: Nonsteroidal antiandrogen

Identifiers
- IUPAC name: (3S,3aS,9aS,9bS)-6-Ethyl-3-hydroxy-3a-methyl-2,3,4,5,8,9,9a,9b-octahydro-1H-cyclopenta[a]naphthalen-7-one
- CAS Number: 83646-97-3 83646-86-0 (acetate)
- PubChem CID: 11776794
- ChemSpider: 9951477
- UNII: Q35F31B844
- CompTox Dashboard (EPA): DTXSID10232491

Chemical and physical data
- Formula: C_{16}H_{24}O_{2}
- Molar mass: 248.366 g·mol^{−1}
- 3D model (JSmol): Interactive image
- SMILES: CCC1=C2CCC3(C(C2CCC1=O)CCC3O)C
- InChI: InChI=1S/C16H24O2/c1-3-10-11-8-9-16(2)13(5-7-15(16)18)12(11)4-6-14(10)17/h12-13,15,18H,3-9H2,1-2H3/t12-,13+,15+,16+/m1/s1; Key:DOTDLCMVUVGSDP-VRKREXBASA-N

Inocoterone (INN; developmental code name RU-29294) is a steroid-like nonsteroidal antiandrogen (NSAA) that was never marketed. An acetate ester, inocoterone acetate, shows greater antiandrogen activity and was developed, as a topical medication for the treatment of acne but showed only modest effectiveness in clinical trials and similarly was never marketed.

== See also ==
- Cioteronel
- Delanterone
- Metogest
- Rosterolone
- Topilutamide
- Topterone
