= Cioteronel =

Chemical compound

Clinical data
- Other names: CPC-10997; Cyoctol; X-Andron
- Routes of administration: By mouth, topical
- Drug class: Nonsteroidal antiandrogen
- ATC code: None

Identifiers
- IUPAC name: 4-(5-methoxyheptyl)-3,3a,4,5,6,6a-hexahydro-1H-pentalen-2-one
- CAS Number: 89672-11-7
- PubChem CID: 55994
- ChemSpider: 50555
- UNII: 1RTH95874Z
- ChEMBL: ChEMBL2104105
- CompTox Dashboard (EPA): DTXSID50869028

Chemical and physical data
- Formula: C_{16}H_{28}O_{2}
- Molar mass: 252.398 g·mol^{−1}
- 3D model (JSmol): Interactive image
- SMILES: CCC(CCCCC1CCC2C1CC(=O)C2)OC
- InChI: InChI=InChI=1S/C16H28O2/c1-3-15(18-2)7-5-4-6-12-8-9-13-10-14(17)11-16(12)13/h12-13,15-16H,3-11H2,1-2H3; Key:KDULJHFMZBRAHO-UHFFFAOYSA-N

Cioteronel (INN, USAN; developmental code CPC-10997; former tentative brand names Cyoctol, X-Andron) is a nonsteroidal antiandrogen (NSAA) that was never marketed. It was under development between 1989 and 2001 for the topical treatment of androgenetic alopecia (male pattern baldness), and acne and for the oral treatment of benign prostatic hyperplasia; it reached phase III clinical trials for acne and phase II studies for androgenetic alopecia, but was ultimately discontinued due to poor efficacy.

== See also ==
- List of investigational hair loss drugs
- Delanterone
- Inocoterone
- Metogest
- Rosterolone
- Topilutamide
- Topterone
- Zanoterone
