= Edogestrone =

Chemical compound

Clinical data
- Other names: Edogesterone; PH-218; 17α-Acetoxy-3,3-ethylenedioxy-6-methylpregn-5-en-20-one
- Drug class: Progestogen; Progestogen ester

Identifiers
- IUPAC name: [(8'R,9'S,10'R,13'S,14'S,17'R)-17'-acetyl-6',10',13'-trimethylspiro[1,3-dioxolane-2,3'-2,4,7,8,9,11,12,14,15,16-decahydro-1H-cyclopenta[a]phenanthrene]-17'-yl] acetate
- CAS Number: 809-01-8
- PubChem CID: 20055315
- ChemSpider: 92030
- UNII: 9014UFK50C
- CompTox Dashboard (EPA): DTXSID501024656

Chemical and physical data
- Formula: C_{26}H_{38}O_{5}
- Molar mass: 430.585 g·mol^{−1}
- 3D model (JSmol): Interactive image
- SMILES: CC1=C2CC3(CCC2(C4CCC5(C(C4C1)CCC5(C(=O)C)OC(=O)C)C)C)OCCO3
- InChI: InChI=1S/C26H38O5/c1-16-14-19-20(23(4)10-11-25(15-22(16)23)29-12-13-30-25)6-8-24(5)21(19)7-9-26(24,17(2)27)31-18(3)28/h19-21H,6-15H2,1-5H3/t19-,20+,21+,23-,24+,26+/m1/s1; Key:UOYMGHSCINLOBK-ZKKYLISVSA-N

Edogestrone (INN, BAN; development code PH-218; also known as edogesterone or 17α-acetoxy-3,3-ethylenedioxy-6-methylpregn-5-en-20-one) is a steroidal progestin and antiandrogen of the 17α-hydroxyprogesterone group which was synthesized in 1964 but was never marketed. Similarly to the structurally related steroid cyproterone acetate, edogestrone binds directly to the androgen receptor and antagonizes it, displacing androgens like testosterone from the receptor, though not as potently as cyproterone acetate. The drug has also been found to suppress androgen production, likely via progesterone receptor activation-mediated antigonadotropic activity.

== See also ==
- Steroidal antiandrogen
- List of progestogens
- List of steroidal antiandrogens
- List of progestogen esters
