= Anticorticotropin =

An anticorticotropin, or anticorticotrophin, is a drug which opposes the actions of corticotropin-releasing hormone (CRH) and/or adrenocorticotropic hormone (ACTH) in relation to their stimulatory effects on the adrenal glands, or which otherwise suppresses steroid hormone production in the adrenal glands. It can be said to have anticorticotropic (or anticorticotrophic) effects, and is used to treat Cushing's syndrome, prostate cancer, hyperandrogenism, and other conditions.

Some examples of anticorticotropins include the following:

- Corticosteroids, including glucocorticoids and mineralocorticoids, which exert negative feedback on the hypothalamic–pituitary–adrenal axis to maintain homeostasis
- High-dose estrogens and antiandrogens, which can partially suppress adrenal androgen production
- Certain progestins such as megestrol acetate, medroxyprogesterone acetate, and cyproterone acetate, which likely work via their weak glucocorticoid activity

Conversely, drugs that stimulate CRH and/or ACTH secretion and/or activate adrenal steroidogenesis, such as antiglucocorticoids like mifepristone, antimineralocorticoids like spironolactone, and adrenal steroidogenesis inhibitors like ketoconazole, metyrapone, mitotane, and aminoglutethimide, have corticotropic or procorticotropic effects.

Anticorticotropins are analogous to antigonadotropins and procorticotropins are analogous to progonadotropins.

== See also ==
- ACTH stimulation test
