= Clometerone =

Chemical compound

Clinical data
- Other names: Clometherone; L-38000; 6α-Chloro-16α-methylprogesterone; 6α-Chloro-16α-methylpregn-4-ene-3,20-dione
- ATC code: None

Identifiers
- IUPAC name: (6S,8S,9S,10R,13S,14S,16R,17S)-17-acetyl-6-chloro-10,13,16-trimethyl-1,2,6,7,8,9,11,12,14,15,16,17-dodecahydrocyclopenta[a]phenanthren-3-one
- CAS Number: 5591-27-5
- PubChem CID: 14515731
- ChemSpider: 16736897
- UNII: 01L3E93T4C
- CompTox Dashboard (EPA): DTXSID20204508

Chemical and physical data
- Formula: C_{22}H_{31}ClO_{2}
- Molar mass: 362.94 g·mol^{−1}
- 3D model (JSmol): Interactive image
- SMILES: C[C@@H]1C[C@H]2[C@@H]3C[C@@H](C4=CC(=O)CC[C@@]4([C@H]3CC[C@@]2([C@H]1C(=O)C)C)C)Cl
- InChI: InChI=1S/C22H31ClO2/c1-12-9-17-15-11-19(23)18-10-14(25)5-7-21(18,3)16(15)6-8-22(17,4)20(12)13(2)24/h10,12,15-17,19-20H,5-9,11H2,1-4H3/t12-,15-,16+,17+,19+,20-,21-,22+/m1/s1; Key:UMRURYMAPMZKQO-NDKKBYRMSA-N

Clometerone (INN; developmental code L-38000; also known as clometherone (USAN) or 6α-chloro-16α-methylprogesterone) is a synthetic pregnane steroid and derivative of progesterone which was reported in 1962 and is described as an antiestrogen and antiandrogen but was never marketed.

Clometerone has been found to suppress estrone-induced uterine hypertrophy in mice at oral and parenteral doses in which progesterone is inactive (active at 10 μg with clometerone and progesterone inactive at 10–100 μg in the case of both routes). However, its progestogenic potency in the Clauberg assay is considerably less than that of progesterone. As such, the progestogenic effects of clometerone do not seem to parallel its estrogenic effects. It was also studied as an antiandrogen in men but was found to slightly increase sebum production when given orally and to variably and inconsistently affect sebum production when given as a topical medication.

== See also ==
- Steroidal antiandrogen
- List of steroidal antiandrogens
