= Antiandrogen =

Class of pharmaceutical drugs

- Drug class
- Bicalutamide, a nonsteroidal antiandrogen and the most widely used androgen receptor antagonist in the treatment of prostate cancer.

Class identifiers
- Synonyms: Androgen antagonists; Androgen blockers; Testosterone blockers
- Use: • Men and boys: Prostate cancer; Benign prostatic hyperplasia; Scalp hair loss; Paraphilias; Hypersexuality; Sex offenders; Precocious puberty; Priapism • Women and girls: Acne; Seborrhea; Hidradenitis suppurativa; Hirsutism; Scalp hair loss; Hyperandrogenism; Transgender hormone therapy (Note: While the use of antiandrogens for the purposes of transgender hormone therapy could be applicable to any testodominant non-cisgender individual, they are classed this way here because this is most common among women and girls.)
- ATC code: L02BB
- Biological target: Androgen receptor; Progesterone receptor; Estrogen receptor; GnRH receptor; 5α-Reductase; CYP17A1 (17α-hydroxylase/17,20-lyase); P450scc; Others
- Chemical class: Steroidal; Nonsteroidal; Peptide

External links
- MeSH: D000726

Legal status

Antiandrogens, also known as androgen antagonists or testosterone blockers, are a class of drugs that prevent androgens like testosterone and dihydrotestosterone (DHT) from mediating their biological effects in the body. They act by blocking the androgen receptor (AR) and/or inhibiting or suppressing androgen production. They can be thought of as the functional opposites of AR agonists, for instance androgens and anabolic steroids (AAS) like testosterone, DHT, and nandrolone and selective androgen receptor modulators (SARMs) like enobosarm. Antiandrogens are one of three types of sex hormone antagonists, the others being antiestrogens and antiprogestogens.

Antiandrogens are used to treat an assortment of androgen-dependent conditions. In men, antiandrogens are used in the treatment of prostate cancer, enlarged prostate, scalp hair loss, overly high sex drive, unusual and problematic sexual urges, and early puberty. In women, antiandrogens are used to treat acne, seborrhea, excessive hair growth, scalp hair loss, and high androgen levels, such as those that occur in polyendocrine metabolic ovarian syndrome (PMOS). Antiandrogens are also used as a component of feminizing hormone therapy for transgender women and as puberty blockers in transgender girls.

Side effects of antiandrogens depend on the type of antiandrogen and the specific antiandrogen in question. In any case, common side effects of antiandrogens in men include breast tenderness, breast enlargement, feminization, hot flashes, sexual dysfunction, infertility, and osteoporosis. In women, antiandrogens are much better tolerated, and antiandrogens that work only by directly blocking androgens are associated with minimal side effects. However, because estrogens are made from androgens in the body, antiandrogens that suppress androgen production can cause low estrogen levels and associated symptoms like hot flashes, menstrual irregularities, and osteoporosis in premenopausal women.

There several major classes of antiandrogens. These include AR antagonists, androgen synthesis inhibitors, and antigonadotropins. AR antagonists work by directly blocking the effects of androgens, while androgen synthesis inhibitors and antigonadotropins work by lowering androgen levels. AR antagonists can be further divided into steroidal antiandrogens and nonsteroidal antiandrogens; androgen synthesis inhibitors can be further divided mostly into CYP17A1 inhibitors and 5α-reductase inhibitors; and antigonadotropins can be further divided into gonadotropin-releasing hormone modulators (GnRH modulators), progestogens, and estrogens.

== Medical uses ==
Antiandrogens are used in the treatment of an assortment of androgen-dependent conditions in both males and females. They are used to treat men with prostate cancer, benign prostatic hyperplasia, pattern hair loss, hypersexuality, paraphilias, and priapism, as well as boys with precocious puberty. In women and girls, antiandrogens are used to treat acne, seborrhea, hidradenitis suppurativa, hirsutism, and hyperandrogenism. Antiandrogens are also used in transgender women as a component of feminizing hormone therapy and as puberty blockers in transgender girls.

=== Males ===
==== Prostate cancer ====
Androgens like testosterone and particularly DHT are importantly involved in the development and progression of prostate cancer. They act as growth factors in the prostate gland, stimulating cell division and tissue growth. In accordance, therapeutic modalities that reduce androgen signaling in the prostate gland, referred to collectively as androgen deprivation therapy, are able to significantly slow the course of prostate cancer and extend life in males with the disease. Although antiandrogens are effective in slowing the progression of prostate cancer, they are not generally curative, and with time, the disease adapts and androgen deprivation therapy eventually becomes ineffective. When this occurs, other treatment approaches, such as chemotherapy, may be considered.

The most common methods of androgen deprivation therapy currently employed to treat prostate cancer are castration (with a GnRH modulator or orchiectomy), nonsteroidal antiandrogens, and the androgen synthesis inhibitor abiraterone acetate. Castration may be used alone or in combination with one of the other two treatments. When castration is combined with a nonsteroidal antiandrogen like bicalutamide, this strategy is referred to as combined androgen blockade (also known as complete or maximal androgen blockade). Enzalutamide, apalutamide, and abiraterone acetate are specifically approved for use in combination with castration to treat castration-resistant prostate cancer. Monotherapy with the nonsteroidal antiandrogen bicalutamide is also used in the treatment of prostate cancer as an alternative to castration with comparable effectiveness but with a different and potentially advantageous side effect profile.

High-dose estrogen was the first functional antiandrogen used to treat prostate cancer. It was widely used, but has largely been abandoned for this indication in favor of newer agents with improved safety profiles and fewer feminizing side effects. Cyproterone acetate was developed subsequently to high-dose estrogen and is the only steroidal antiandrogen that has been widely used in the treatment of prostate cancer, but it has largely been replaced by nonsteroidal antiandrogens, which are newer and have greater effectiveness, tolerability, and safety. Bicalutamide, as well as enzalutamide, have largely replaced the earlier nonsteroidal antiandrogens flutamide and nilutamide, which are now little used. The earlier androgen synthesis inhibitors aminoglutethimide and ketoconazole have only limitedly been used in the treatment of prostate cancer due to toxicity concerns and have been replaced by abiraterone acetate.

In addition to active treatment of prostate cancer, antiandrogens are effective as prophylaxis (preventatives) in reducing the risk of ever developing prostate cancer. Antiandrogens have only limitedly been assessed for this purpose, but the 5α-reductase inhibitors finasteride and dutasteride and the steroidal AR antagonist spironolactone have been associated with significantly reduced risk of prostate cancer. In addition, it is notable that prostate cancer is extremely rare in transgender women who have been on feminizing hormone therapy for an extended period of time.

==== Enlarged prostate ====
The 5α-reductase inhibitors finasteride and dutasteride are used to treat benign prostatic hyperplasia, a condition in which the prostate becomes enlarged and this results in urinary obstruction and discomfort. They are effective because androgens act as growth factors in the prostate gland. The antiandrogens chlormadinone acetate and oxendolone and the functional antiandrogens allylestrenol and gestonorone caproate are also approved in some countries for the treatment of benign prostatic hyperplasia.

==== Scalp hair loss ====
5α-Reductase inhibitors like finasteride, dutasteride, and alfatradiol and the topical nonsteroidal AR antagonist topilutamide (fluridil) are approved for the treatment of pattern hair loss, also known as scalp hair loss or baldness. This condition is generally caused by androgens, so antiandrogens can slow or halt its progression. Systemic antiandrogens besides 5α-reductase inhibitors are not generally used to treat scalp hair loss in males due to risks like feminization (e.g., gynecomastia) and sexual dysfunction. However, they have been assessed and reported to be effective for this indication.

==== Acne ====
Systemic antiandrogens are generally not used to treat acne in males due to their high risk of feminization (e.g., gynecomastia) and sexual dysfunction. However, they have been studied for acne in males and found to be effective. Clascoterone, a topical antiandrogen, is effective for acne in males, albeit modestly, and has been approved by the FDA in August 2020.

==== Paraphilias ====
Androgens increase sex drive, and for this reason, antiandrogens are able to reduce sex drive in males. In accordance, antiandrogens are used in the treatment of conditions such as hypersexuality (excessively high sex drive) and paraphilias (atypical and sometimes societally unacceptable sexual interests) like pedophilia (sexual attraction to children). They have been used to decrease sex drive in sex offenders so as to reduce the likelihood of recidivism (repeat offenses). Antiandrogens used for these indications include cyproterone acetate, medroxyprogesterone acetate, and GnRH modulators.

==== Early puberty ====
Antiandrogens are used to treat precocious puberty in males. They work by opposing the effects of androgens and delaying the development of secondary sexual characteristics and onset of changes in sex drive and function until a more appropriate age. Antiandrogens that have been used for this purpose include cyproterone acetate, medroxyprogesterone acetate, GnRH modulators, spironolactone, bicalutamide, and ketoconazole. Spironolactone and bicalutamide require combination with an aromatase inhibitor to prevent the effects of unopposed estrogens, while the others can be used alone.

==== Long-lasting erections ====
Antiandrogens are effective in the treatment of recurrent priapism (potentially painful penile erections that last more than four hours).

=== Women and girls ===
==== Skin and hair conditions ====
Antiandrogens are used in the treatment of androgen-dependent skin and hair conditions including acne, seborrhea, hidradenitis suppurativa, hirsutism, and pattern hair loss in women. All of these conditions are dependent on androgens, and for this reason, antiandrogens are effective in treating them. The most commonly used antiandrogens for these indications are cyproterone acetate and spironolactone. Flutamide has also been studied extensively for such uses, but has fallen out of favor due to its association with hepatotoxicity. Bicalutamide, which has a relatively minimal risk of hepatotoxicity, has been evaluated for the treatment of hirsutism and found effective similarly to flutamide and may be used instead of it. In addition to AR antagonists, oral contraceptives containing ethinylestradiol are effective in treating these conditions, and may be combined with AR antagonists.

==== High androgen levels ====
Hyperandrogenism is a condition in women in which androgen levels are excessively and abnormally high. It is commonly seen in women with PMOS, and also occurs in women with intersex conditions like congenital adrenal hyperplasia. Hyperandrogenism is associated with virilization – that is, the development of masculine secondary sexual characteristics like male-pattern facial and body hair growth (or hirsutism), voice deepening, increased muscle mass and strength, and broadening of the shoulders, among others. Androgen-dependent skin and hair conditions like acne and pattern hair loss may also occur in hyperandrogenism, and menstrual disturbances, like amenorrhea, are commonly seen. Although antiandrogens do not treat the underlying cause of hyperandrogenism (e.g., PMOS), they are able to prevent and reverse its manifestation and effects. As with androgen-dependent skin and hair conditions, the most commonly used antiandrogens in the treatment of hyperandrogenism in women are cyproterone acetate and spironolactone. Other antiandrogens, like bicalutamide, may be used alternatively.

==== Transgender hormone therapy ====
Antiandrogens are used to prevent or reverse masculinization and to facilitate feminization in transgender women and some non-binary transfeminine individuals who are undergoing hormone therapy and who have not undergone sex reassignment surgery or orchiectomy. Besides estrogens, the main antiandrogens that have been used for this purpose are cyproterone acetate, spironolactone, and GnRH modulators. Nonsteroidal antiandrogens like bicalutamide are also used for this indication. In addition to use in transgender women, antiandrogens, mainly GnRH modulators, are used as puberty blockers to prevent the onset of puberty in transgender girls until they are older and ready to begin hormone therapy.

=== Available forms ===
There are several different types of antiandrogens, including the following:

- Androgen receptor antagonists: Drugs that bind directly to and block the AR. These drugs include the steroidal antiandrogens cyproterone acetate, megestrol acetate, chlormadinone acetate, spironolactone, oxendolone, and osaterone acetate (veterinary) and the nonsteroidal antiandrogens flutamide, bicalutamide, nilutamide, topilutamide, enzalutamide, apalutamide, and darolutamide. Aside from cyproterone acetate and chlormadinone acetate, a few other progestins used in oral contraceptives and/or in menopausal HRT including dienogest, drospirenone, medrogestone, nomegestrol acetate, promegestone, and trimegestone also have varying degrees of AR antagonistic activity.
- Androgen synthesis inhibitors: Drugs that directly inhibit the enzymatic biosynthesis of androgens like testosterone and/or DHT. Examples include the CYP17A1 inhibitors ketoconazole, abiraterone acetate, and seviteronel, the CYP11A1 (P450scc) inhibitor aminoglutethimide, and the 5α-reductase inhibitors finasteride, dutasteride, epristeride, alfatradiol, and saw palmetto extract (Serenoa repens). A number of other antiandrogens, including cyproterone acetate, spironolactone, medrogestone, flutamide, nilutamide, and bifluranol, are also known to weakly inhibit androgen synthesis.
- Antigonadotropins: Drugs that suppress the gonadotropin-releasing hormone (GnRH)-induced release of gonadotropins and consequent activation of gonadal androgen production. Examples include GnRH modulators like leuprorelin (a GnRH agonist) and cetrorelix (a GnRH antagonist), progestogens like allylestrenol, chlormadinone acetate, cyproterone acetate, gestonorone caproate, hydroxyprogesterone caproate, medroxyprogesterone acetate, megestrol acetate, osaterone acetate (veterinary), and oxendolone, and estrogens like estradiol, estradiol esters, ethinylestradiol, conjugated estrogens, and diethylstilbestrol.
- Miscellaneous: Drugs that oppose the effects of androgens by means other than the above. Examples include estrogens, especially oral and synthetic (e.g., ethinylestradiol, diethylstilbestrol), which stimulate sex hormone-binding globulin (SHBG) production in the liver and thereby decrease free and hence bioactive levels of testosterone and DHT; anticorticotropins such as glucocorticoids, which suppress the adrenocorticotropic hormone (ACTH)-induced production of adrenal androgens; and immunogens and vaccines against androstenedione like ovandrotone albumin and androstenedione albumin, which decrease levels of androgens via the generation of antibodies against the androgen and androgen precursor androstenedione (used only in veterinary medicine).

Certain antiandrogens combine multiple of the above mechanisms. An example is the steroidal antiandrogen cyproterone acetate, which is a potent AR antagonist, a potent progestogen and hence antigonadotropin, a weak glucocorticoid and hence anticorticotropin, and a weak androgen synthesis inhibitor.

Antiandrogens marketed for clinical or veterinary use
Generic name	Class	Type	Brand name(s)	Route(s)	Launch	Status	Hits^{a}
Abiraterone acetate	Steroidal	Androgen synthesis inhibitor	Zytiga	Oral	2011	Available	523,000
Allylestrenol	Steroidal	Progestin	Gestanin, Perselin	Oral	1961	Available^{b}	61,800
Aminoglutethimide	Nonsteroidal	Androgen synthesis inhibitor	Cytadren, Orimeten	Oral	1960	Available^{b}	222,000
Apalutamide	Nonsteroidal	AR antagonist	Erleada	Oral	2018	Available	50,400
Bicalutamide	Nonsteroidal	AR antagonist	Casodex	Oral	1995	Available	754,000
Chlormadinone acetate	Steroidal	Progestin; AR antagonist	Belara, Prostal	Oral	1965	Available	220,000
Cyproterone acetate	Steroidal	Progestin; AR antagonist	Androcur, Diane	Oral, IM	1973	Available	461,000
Darolutamide	Nonsteroidal	AR antagonist	Nubeqa	Oral	2019	Available	?
Delmadinone acetate	Steroidal	Progestin; AR antagonist	Tardak	Veterinary	1972	Veterinary	42,600
Enzalutamide	Nonsteroidal	AR antagonist	Xtandi	Oral	2012	Available	328,000
Flutamide	Nonsteroidal	AR antagonist	Eulexin	Oral	1983	Available	712,000
Gestonorone caproate	Steroidal	Progestin	Depostat, Primostat	IM	1973	Available^{b}	119,000
Hydroxyprogesterone caproate	Steroidal	Progestin	Delalutin, Proluton	IM	1954	Available	108,000
Ketoconazole	Nonsteroidal	Androgen synthesis inhibitor	Nizoral, others	Oral, topical	1981	Available	3,650,000
Medroxyprogesterone acetate	Steroidal	Progestin	Provera, Depo-Provera	Oral, IM, SC	1958	Available	1,250,000
Megestrol acetate	Steroidal	Progestin; AR antagonist	Megace	Oral	1963	Available	253,000
Nilutamide	Nonsteroidal	AR antagonist	Anandron, Nilandron	Oral	1987	Available	132,000
Osaterone acetate	Steroidal	Progestin; AR antagonist	Ypozane	Veterinary	2007	Veterinary	87,600
Oxendolone	Steroidal	Progestin; AR antagonist	Prostetin, Roxenone	IM	1981	Available^{b}	36,100
Spironolactone	Steroidal	AR antagonist	Aldactone	Oral, topical	1959	Available	3,010,000
Topilutamide	Nonsteroidal	AR antagonist	Eucapil	Topical	2003	Available^{b}	36,300
Footnotes: ^{a} = Hits = Google Search hits (as of February 2018). ^{b} = Availability limited / mostly discontinued. Class: Steroidal = Steroidal antiandrogen. Nonsteroidal = Nonsteroidal antiandrogen. Note: For other antiandrogens not included in the table like 5α-reductase inhibitors, GnRH modulators, and estrogens, see elsewhere. Sources: See individual articles.

== Side effects ==
The side effects of antiandrogens vary depending on the type of antiandrogen – namely whether it is a selective AR antagonist or lowers androgen levels – as well as the presence of off-target activity in the antiandrogen in question. For instance, whereas antigonadotropic antiandrogens like GnRH modulators and cyproterone acetate are associated with pronounced sexual dysfunction and osteoporosis in men, selective AR antagonists like bicalutamide are not associated with osteoporosis and have been associated with only minimal sexual dysfunction. These differences are thought related to the fact that antigonadotropins suppress androgen levels and by extension levels of bioactive metabolites of androgens like estrogens and neurosteroids whereas selective AR antagonists similarly neutralize the effects of androgens but leave levels of androgens and hence their metabolites intact (and in fact can even increase them as a result of their progonadotropic effects). As another example, the steroidal antiandrogens cyproterone acetate and spironolactone possess off-target actions including progestogenic, antimineralocorticoid, and/or glucocorticoid activity in addition to their antiandrogen activity, and these off-target activities can result in additional side effects.

In males, the major side effects of antiandrogens are demasculinization and feminization. These side effects include breast pain/tenderness and gynecomastia (breast development/enlargement), reduced body hair growth/density, decreased muscle mass and strength, feminine changes in fat mass and distribution, and reduced penile length and testicular size. The rates of gynecomastia in men with selective AR antagonist monotherapy have been found to range from 30 to 85%. In addition, antiandrogens can cause infertility, osteoporosis, hot flashes, sexual dysfunction (including loss of libido and erectile dysfunction), depression, fatigue, anemia, and decreased semen/ejaculate volume in males. Conversely, the side effects of selective AR antagonists in women are minimal. However, antigonadotropic antiandrogens like cyproterone acetate can produce hypoestrogenism, amenorrhea, and osteoporosis in premenopausal women, among other side effects. In addition, androgen receptor antagonists can produce unfavorable effects on cholesterol levels, which long-term may increase the risk of cardiovascular disease.

A number of antiandrogens have been associated with hepatotoxicity. These include, to varying extents, cyproterone acetate, flutamide, nilutamide, bicalutamide, aminoglutethimide, and ketoconazole. In contrast, spironolactone, enzalutamide, and other antiandrogens are not associated with significant rates of hepatotoxicity. However, although they do not pose a risk of hepatotoxicity, spironolactone has a risk of hyperkalemia and enzalutamide has a risk of seizures.

In women who are pregnant, antiandrogens can interfere with the androgen-mediated sexual differentiation of the genitalia and brain of male fetuses. This manifests primarily as ambiguous genitalia – that is, undervirilized or feminized genitalia, which, anatomically, are a cross between a penis and a vagina – and theoretically also as femininity. As such, antiandrogens are teratogens, and women who are pregnant should not be treated with an antiandrogen. Moreover, women who can or may become pregnant are strongly recommended to take an antiandrogen only in combination with proper contraception.

== Overdose ==
Antiandrogens are relatively safe in acute overdose.

== Interactions ==
Inhibitors and inducers of cytochrome P450 enzymes may interact with various antiandrogens.

== Mechanism of action ==
=== Androgen receptor antagonists ===
Antiandrogens at steroid hormone receptors
Antiandrogen	Relative binding affinities				
Antiandrogen	AR	PR	ER	GR	MR
Cyproterone acetate	8–10	60	<0.1	5	1
Chlormadinone acetate	5	175	<0.1	38	1
Megestrol acetate	5	152	<0.1	50	3
Spironolactone	7	0.4^{a}	<0.1	2^{a}	182
Trimethyltrienolone	3.6	<1	<1	<1	<1
Inocoterone	0.8	<0.1	<0.1	<0.1	<0.1
Inocoterone acetate	<0.1	<0.1	<0.1	<0.1	<0.1
Flutamide	<0.1	<0.1	<0.1	<0.1	<0.1
Hydroxyflutamide	0.5–0.8	<0.1	<0.1	<0.1	<0.1
Nilutamide	0.5–0.8	<0.1	<0.1	<0.1	<0.1
Bicalutamide	1.8	<0.1	<0.1	<0.1	<0.1
Notes: (1): Reference ligands (100%) were testosterone for the AR, progesterone for the PR, estradiol for the ER, dexamethasone for the GR, and aldosterone for the MR. (2): Tissues were rat prostate (AR), rabbit uterus (PR), mouse uterus (ER), rat thymus (GR), and rat kidney (MR). (3): Incubation times (0 °C) were 24 hours (AR, ^{a}), 2 hours (PR, ER), 4 hours (GR), and 1 hour (MR). (4): Assay methods were different for bicalutamide for receptors besides the AR. Sources:

Relative potencies of selected antiandrogens
Antiandrogen	Relative potency
Bicalutamide	4.3
Hydroxyflutamide	3.5
Flutamide	3.3
Cyproterone acetate	1.0
Zanoterone	0.4
Description: Relative potencies of orally administered antiandrogens in antagonizing 0.8 to 1.0 mg/kg s.c. testosterone propionate-induced ventral prostate weight increase in castrated immature male rats. Higher values mean greater potency. Sources: See template.

AR antagonists act by directly binding to and competitively displacing androgens like testosterone and DHT from the AR, thereby preventing them from activating the receptor and mediating their biological effects. AR antagonists are classified into two types, based on chemical structure: steroidal and nonsteroidal. Steroidal AR antagonists are structurally related to steroid hormones like testosterone and progesterone, whereas nonsteroidal AR antagonists are not steroids and are structurally distinct. Steroidal AR antagonists tend to have off-target hormonal actions due to their structural similarity to other steroid hormones. In contrast, nonsteroidal AR antagonists are selective for the AR and have no off-target hormonal activity. For this reason, they are sometimes described as "pure" antiandrogens.

Although they are described as antiandrogens and indeed show only such effects generally, most or all steroidal AR antagonists are actually not silent antagonists of the AR but rather are weak partial agonists and are able to activate the receptor in the absence of more potent AR agonists like testosterone and DHT. This may have clinical implications in the specific context of prostate cancer treatment. As an example, steroidal AR antagonists are able to increase prostate weight and accelerate prostate cancer cell growth in the absence of more potent AR agonists, and spironolactone has been found to accelerate progression of prostate cancer in case reports. In addition, whereas cyproterone acetate produces ambiguous genitalia via feminization in male fetuses when administered to pregnant animals, it has been found to produce masculinization of the genitalia of female fetuses of pregnant animals. In contrast to steroidal AR antagonists, nonsteroidal AR antagonists are silent antagonists of the AR and do not activate the receptor. This may be why they have greater efficacy than steroidal AR antagonists in the treatment of prostate cancer and is an important reason as to why they have largely replaced them for this indication in medicine.

Nonsteroidal antiandrogens have relatively low affinity for the AR compared to steroidal AR ligands. For example, bicalutamide has around 2% of the affinity of DHT for the AR and around 20% of the affinity of CPA for the AR. Despite their low affinity for the AR however, the lack of weak partial agonist activity of NSAAs appears to improve their potency relative to steroidal antiandrogens. For example, although flutamide has about 10-fold lower affinity for the AR than CPA, it shows equal or slightly greater potency to CPA as an antiandrogen in bioassays. In addition, circulating therapeutic concentrations of nonsteroidal antiandrogens are very high, on the order of thousands of times higher than those of testosterone and DHT, and this allows them to efficaciously compete and block AR signaling.

AR antagonists may not bind to or block membrane androgen receptors (mARs), which are distinct from the classical nuclear AR. However, the mARs do not appear to be involved in masculinization. This is evidenced by the perfectly female phenotype of women with complete androgen insensitivity syndrome. These women have a 46,XY karyotype (i.e., are genetically "male") and high levels of androgens but possess a defective AR and for this reason never masculinize. They are described as highly feminine, both physically as well as mentally and behaviorally.

==== N-Terminal domain antagonists ====
N-Terminal domain AR antagonists are a new type of AR antagonist that, unlike all currently marketed AR antagonists, bind to the N-terminal domain (NTD) of the AR rather than the ligand-binding domain (LBD). Whereas conventional AR antagonists bind to the LBD of the AR and competitively displace androgens, thereby preventing them from activating the receptor, AR NTD antagonists bind covalently to the NTD of the AR and prevent protein–protein interactions subsequent to activation that are required for transcriptional activity. As such, they are non-competitive and irreversible antagonists of the AR. Examples of AR NTD antagonists include bisphenol A diglycidyl ether (BADGE) and its derivatives EPI-001, ralaniten (EPI-002), and ralaniten acetate (EPI-506). AR NTD antagonists are under investigation for the potential treatment of prostate cancer, and it is thought that they may have greater efficacy as antiandrogens relative to conventional AR antagonists. In accordance with this notion, AR NTD antagonists are active against splice variants of the AR, which conventional AR antagonists are not, and AR NTD antagonists are immune to gain-of-function mutations in the AR LBD that convert AR antagonists into AR agonists and commonly occur in prostate cancer.

==== Androgen receptor degraders ====
Selective androgen receptor degraders (SARDs) are another new type of antiandrogen that has recently been developed. They work by enhancing the degradation of the AR, and are analogous to selective estrogen receptor degraders (SERDs) like fulvestrant (a drug used to treat estrogen receptor-positive breast cancer). Similarly to AR NTD antagonists, it is thought that SARDs may have greater efficacy than conventional AR antagonists, and for this reason, they are under investigation for the treatment of prostate cancer. An example of a SARD is dimethylcurcumin (ASC-J9), which is under development as a topical medication for the potential treatment of acne. SARDs like dimethylcurcumin differ from conventional AR antagonists and AR NTD antagonists in that they may not necessarily bind directly to the AR.

=== Androgen synthesis inhibitors ===
Androgen synthesis inhibitors are enzyme inhibitors that prevent the biosynthesis of androgens. This process occurs mainly in the gonads and adrenal glands, but also occurs in other tissues like the prostate gland, skin, and hair follicles. These drugs include aminoglutethimide, ketoconazole, and abiraterone acetate. Aminoglutethimide inhibits cholesterol side-chain cleavage enzyme, also known as P450scc or CYP11A1, which is responsible for the conversion of cholesterol into pregnenolone and by extension the production of all steroid hormones, including the androgens. Ketoconazole and abiraterone acetate are inhibitors of the enzyme CYP17A1, also known as 17α-hydroxylase/17,20-lyase, which is responsible for the conversion of pregnane steroids into androgens, as well as the conversion of mineralocorticoids into glucocorticoids. Because these drugs all prevent the formation of glucocorticoids in addition to androgens, they must be combined with a glucocorticoid like prednisone to avoid adrenal insufficiency. A newer drug currently under development for treatment of prostate cancer, seviteronel, is selective for inhibition of the 17,20-lyase functionality of CYP17A1, and for this reason, unlike earlier drugs, does not require concomitant treatment with a glucocorticoid.

==== 5α-Reductase inhibitors ====
5α-Reductase inhibitors such as finasteride and dutasteride are inhibitors of 5α-reductase, an enzyme that is responsible for the formation of DHT from testosterone. DHT is between 2.5- and 10-fold more potent than testosterone as an androgen and is produced in a tissue-selective manner based on expression of 5α-reductase. Tissues in which DHT forms at a high rate include the prostate gland, skin, and hair follicles. In accordance, DHT is involved in the pathophysiology of benign prostatic hyperplasia, pattern hair loss, and hirsutism, and 5α-reductase inhibitors are used to treat these conditions.

=== Antigonadotropins ===
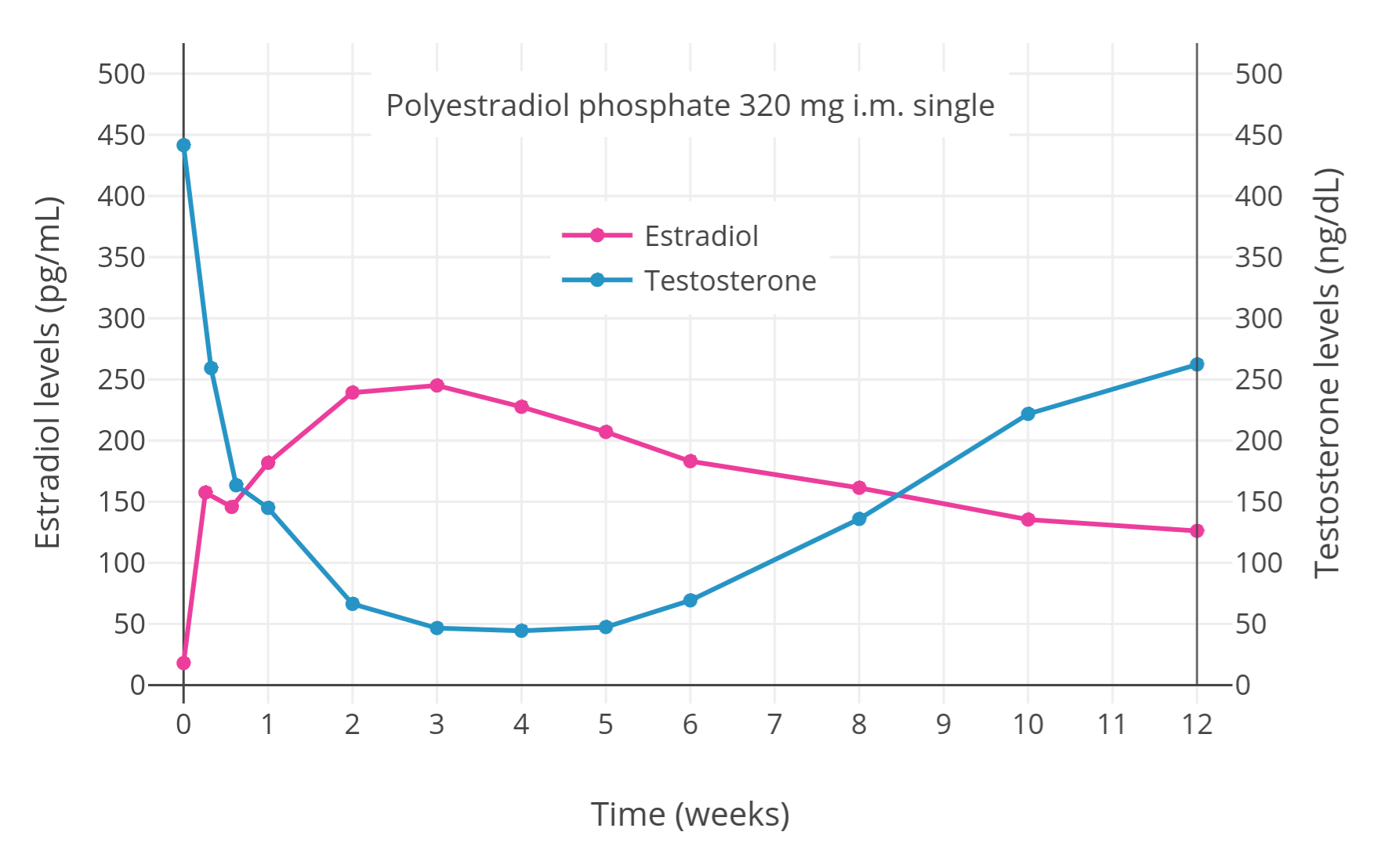
Estradiol and testosterone levels following a single intramuscular injection of 320 mg polyestradiol phosphate, a polymeric estradiol ester and prodrug, in men with prostate cancer.

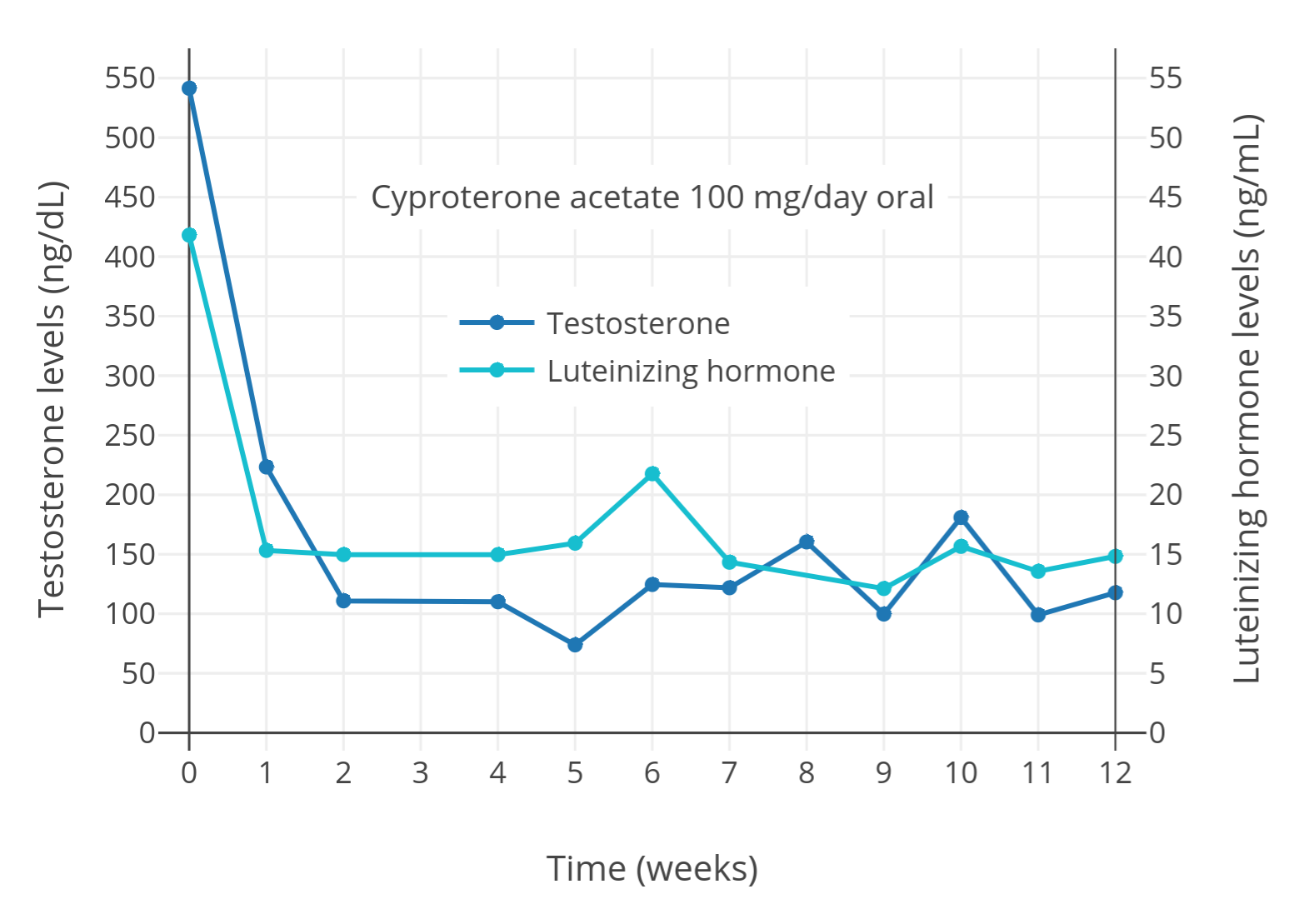
Testosterone and luteinizing hormone levels with 100 mg/day oral cyproterone acetate in men.

Antigonadotropins are drugs that suppress the GnRH-mediated secretion of gonadotropins from the pituitary gland. Gonadotropins include luteinizing hormone (LH) and follicle-stimulating hormone (FSH) and are peptide hormones that signal the gonads to produce sex hormones. By suppressing gonadotropin secretion, antigonadotropins suppress gonadal sex hormone production and by extension circulating androgen levels. GnRH modulators, including both GnRH agonists and GnRH antagonists, are powerful antigonadotropins that are able to suppress androgen levels by 95% in men. In addition, estrogens and progestogens are antigonadotropins via exertion of negative feedback on the hypothalamic–pituitary–gonadal axis (HPG axis). High-dose estrogens are able to suppress androgen levels to castrate levels in men similarly to GnRH modulators, while high-dose progestogens are able to suppress androgen levels by up to approximately 70 to 80% in men.

Examples of GnRH agonists include leuprorelin (leuprolide) and goserelin, while an example of a GnRH antagonist is cetrorelix. Estrogens that are or that have been used as antigonadotropins include estradiol, estradiol esters like estradiol valerate, estradiol undecylate, and polyestradiol phosphate, conjugated estrogens, ethinylestradiol, diethylstilbestrol (no longer widely used), and bifluranol. Progestogens that are used as antigonadotropins include chlormadinone acetate, cyproterone acetate, gestonorone caproate, hydroxyprogesterone caproate, medroxyprogesterone acetate, megestrol acetate, and oxendolone.

=== Miscellaneous ===
==== Sex hormone-binding globulin modulators ====
In addition to their antigonadotropic effects, estrogens are also functional antiandrogens by decreasing free concentrations of androgens via increasing the hepatic production of sex hormone-binding globulin (SHBG) and by extension circulating SHBG levels. Combined oral contraceptives containing ethinylestradiol have been found to increase circulating SHBG levels by 2- to 4-fold in women and to reduce free testosterone concentrations by 40 to 80%. However, combined oral contraceptives that contain the particularly androgenic progestin levonorgestrel have been found to increase SHBG levels by only 50 to 100%, which is likely because activation of the AR in the liver has the opposite effect of estrogen and suppresses production of SHBG. Levonorgestrel and certain other 19-nortestosterone progestins used in combined oral contraceptives like norethisterone also directly bind to and displace androgens from SHBG, which may additionally antagonize the functional antiandrogenic effects of ethinylestradiol. In men, a study found that treatment with a relatively low dosage of 20 μg/day ethinylestradiol for 5 weeks increased circulating SHBG levels by 150% and, due to the accompanying decrease free testosterone levels, increased total circulating levels of testosterone by 50% (via reduced negative feedback by androgens on the HPG axis).

==== Corticosteroid-binding globulin modulators ====
Estrogens at high doses can partially suppress adrenal androgen production. A study found that treatment with a high-dose ethinylestradiol (100 μg/day) reduced levels of major circulating adrenal androgens by 27 to 48% in transgender women. Decreased adrenal androgens with estrogens is apparent with oral and synthetic estrogens like ethinylestradiol and estramustine phosphate but is minimal with parenteral bioidentical estradiol forms like polyestradiol phosphate. It is thought to be mediated via a hepatic mechanism, probably increased corticosteroid-binding globulin (CBG) production and levels and compensatory changes in adrenal steroid production (e.g., shunting of adrenal androgen synthesis to cortisol production). It is notable in this regard that oral and synthetic estrogens, due to the oral first pass and resistance to hepatic metabolism, have much stronger influences on liver protein synthesis than parenteral estradiol. The decrease in adrenal androgen levels with high-dose estrogen therapy may be beneficial in the treatment of prostate cancer.

==== Anticorticotropins ====
Anticorticotropins such as glucocorticoids and mineralocorticoids work by exerting negative feedback on the hypothalamic–pituitary–adrenal axis (HPA axis), thereby inhibiting the secretion of corticotropin-releasing hormone (CRH) and hence adrenocorticotropic hormone (ACTH; corticotropin) and consequently suppressing the production of androgen prohormones like dehydroepiandrosterone (DHEA), dehydroepiandrosterone sulfate (DHEA-S), and androstenedione in the adrenal gland. They are rarely used clinically as functional antiandrogens, but are used as such in the case of congenital adrenal hyperplasia in girls and women, in which there are excessive production and levels of adrenal androgens due to glucocorticoid deficiency and hence HPA axis overactivity.

==== Insulin sensitizers ====
In women with insulin resistance, such as those with polyendocrine metabolic ovarian syndrome (PMOS) androgen levels are often elevated. Metformin, an insulin-sensitizing medication, has indirect antiandrogenic effects in such women, decreasing testosterone levels by as much as 50% secondary to its beneficial effects on insulin sensitivity.

==== Immunogens and vaccines ====
Ovandrotone albumin (Fecundin, Ovastim) and Androvax (androstenedione albumin) are immunogens and vaccines against androstenedione that are used in veterinary medicine to improve fecundity (reproductive rate) in ewes (adult female sheep). The generation of antibodies against androstenedione by these agents is thought to decrease circulating levels of androstenedione and its metabolites (e.g., testosterone and estrogens), which in turn increases the activity of the HPG axis via reduced negative feedback and increases the rate of ovulation, resulting in greater fertility and fecundity.

== Chemistry ==
Antiandrogens can be divided into several different types based on chemical structure, including steroidal antiandrogens, nonsteroidal antiandrogens, and peptides. Steroidal antiandrogens include compounds like cyproterone acetate, spironolactone, estradiol, abiraterone acetate, and finasteride; nonsteroidal antiandrogens include compounds like bicalutamide, elagolix, diethylstilbestrol, aminoglutethimide, and ketoconazole; and peptides include GnRH analogues like leuprorelin and cetrorelix.

== History ==
Antigonadotropins like estrogens and progestogens were both first introduced in the 1930s. The beneficial effects of androgen deprivation via surgical castration or high-dose estrogen therapy on prostate cancer were discovered in 1941. AR antagonists were first discovered in the early 1960s. The steroidal antiandrogen cyproterone acetate was discovered in 1961 and introduced in 1973, and is often described as the first antiandrogen to have been marketed. However, spironolactone was introduced in 1959, although its antiandrogen effects were not recognized or taken advantage of until later and were originally an unintended off-target action of the drug. In addition to spironolactone, chlormadinone acetate and megestrol acetate are steroidal antiandrogens that are weaker than cyproterone acetate but were also introduced earlier, in the 1960s. Other early steroidal antiandrogens that were developed around this time but were never marketed include benorterone (SKF-7690; 17α-methyl-B-nortestosterone), BOMT (Ro 7–2340), cyproterone (SH-80881), and trimethyltrienolone (R-2956).

The nonsteroidal antiandrogen flutamide was first reported in 1967. It was introduced in 1983 and was the first nonsteroidal antiandrogen marketed. Another early nonsteroidal antiandrogen, DIMP (Ro 7–8117), which is structurally related to thalidomide and is a relatively weak antiandrogen, was first described in 1973 and was never marketed. Flutamide was followed by nilutamide in 1989, and bicalutamide in 1995. In addition to these three drugs, which have been regarded as first-generation nonsteroidal antiandrogens, the second-generation nonsteroidal antiandrogens enzalutamide and apalutamide were introduced in 2012 and 2018, respectively. They differ from the earlier nonsteroidal antiandrogens namely in that they are much more efficacious in comparison.

The androgen synthesis inhibitors aminoglutethimide and ketoconazole were first marketed in 1960 and 1977, respectively, and the newer drug abiraterone acetate was introduced in 2011. GnRH modulators were first introduced in the 1980s. The 5α-reductase inhibitors finasteride and dutasteride were introduced in 1992. and 2002. respectively. Elagolix, the first orally active GnRH modulator to be marketed, was introduced in 2018.

=== Timeline ===
The following is a timeline of events in the history of antiandrogens:

- 1941: Hudgins and Hodges show that androgen deprivation via high-dose estrogen therapy or surgical castration treats prostate cancer
- 1957: The steroidal antiandrogen spironolactone is first synthesized
- 1960: Spironolactone is first introduced for medical use, as an antimineralocorticoid
- 1961: The steroidal antiandrogen cyproterone acetate is first synthesized
- 1962: Spironolactone is first reported to produce gynecomastia in men
- 1966: Benorterone is the first known antiandrogen to be studied clinically, to treat acne and hirsutism in women
- 1963: The antiandrogenic activity of cyproterone acetate is discovered
- 1967: A known antiandrogen, benorterone, is first reported to induce gynecomastia in males
- 1967: The first-generation nonsteroidal antiandrogen flutamide is first synthesized
- 1967: Cyproterone acetate was first studied clinically, to treat sexual deviance in men
- 1969: Cyproterone acetate was first studied in the treatment of acne, hirsutism, seborrhea, and scalp hair loss in women
- 1969: The antiandrogenic activity of spironolactone is discovered
- 1972: The antiandrogenic activity of flutamide is first reported
- 1973: Cyproterone acetate was first introduced for medical use, to treat sexual deviance
- 1977: The first-generation antiandrogen nilutamide is first described
- 1978: Spironolactone is first studied in the treatment of hirsutism in women
- 1979: Combined androgen blockade is first studied
- 1980: Medical castration via a GnRH analogue is first achieved
- 1982: The first-generation antiandrogen bicalutamide is first described
- 1982: Combined androgen blockade for prostate cancer is developed
- 1983: Flutamide is first introduced, in Chile, for medical use, to treat prostate cancer
- 1987: Nilutamide is first introduced, in France, for medical use, to treat prostate cancer
- 1989: Combined androgen blockade via flutamide and a GnRH analogue is found to be superior to a GnRH analogue alone for prostate cancer
- 1989: Flutamide is first introduced for medical use in the United States, to treat prostate cancer
- 1989: Flutamide is first studied in the treatment of hirsutism in women
- 1992: The androgen synthesis inhibitor abiraterone acetate is first described
- 1995: Bicalutamide is first introduced for medical use, to treat prostate cancer
- 1996: Nilutamide is first introduced for medical use in the United States, to treat prostate cancer
- 2006: The second-generation nonsteroidal antiandrogen enzalutamide is first described
- 2007: The second-generation nonsteroidal antiandrogen apalutamide is first described
- 2011: Abiraterone acetate is first introduced for medical use, to treat prostate cancer
- 2012: Enzalutamide is first introduced for medical use, to treat prostate cancer
- 2018: Apalutamide is first introduced for medical use, to treat prostate cancer
- 2018: Elagolix is the first orally active GnRH antagonist to be introduced for medical use
- 2019: Relugolix is the second orally active GnRH antagonist to be introduced for medical use
- 2019: Darolutamide is first introduced for medical use, to treat prostate cancer

== Society and culture ==
=== Etymology ===
The term antiandrogen is generally used to refer specifically to AR antagonists, as described by Dorfman (1970):

Antiandrogens are substances which prevent androgens from expressing their activity at target sites. The inhibitory effect of these substances, therefore, should be differentiated from compounds which decrease the synthesis and/or release of hypothalamic (releasing) factors, from anterior pituitary hormones (gonadotropins, particularly luteinizing hormone) and from material which acts directly on the gonads to inhibit biosynthesis and/or secretion of androgens.

However, in spite of the above, the term may also be used to describe functional antiandrogens like androgen synthesis inhibitors and antigonadotropins, including even estrogens and progestogens. For example, the progestogen and hence antigonadotropin medroxyprogesterone acetate is sometimes described as a steroidal antiandrogen, even though it is not an antagonist of the AR.

== Research ==
=== Topical administration ===
There has been much interest and effort in the development of topical AR antagonists to treat androgen-dependent conditions like acne and pattern hair loss in males. Unfortunately, whereas systemic administration of antiandrogens is very effective in treating these conditions, topical administration has disappointingly been found generally to possess limited and only modest effectiveness, even when high-affinity steroidal AR antagonists like cyproterone acetate and spironolactone have been employed. Moreover, in the specific case of acne treatment, topical AR antagonists have been found much less effective compared to established treatments like benzoyl peroxide and antibiotics.

A variety of AR antagonists have been developed for topical use but have not completed development and hence have never been marketed. These include the steroidal AR antagonists cyproterone, rosterolone, and topterone and the nonsteroidal AR antagonists cioteronel, inocoterone acetate, RU-22930, RU-58642, and RU-58841. However, one topical AR antagonist, topilutamide (fluridil), has been introduced in a few European countries for the treatment of pattern hair loss in men. In addition, a topical 5α-reductase inhibitor and weak estrogen, alfatradiol, has also been introduced in some European countries for the same indication, although its effectiveness is controversial. Spironolactone has been marketed in Italy in the form of a topical cream under the brand name Spiroderm for the treatment of acne and hirsutism, but this formulation was discontinued and hence is no longer available.

Topical clascoterone, brand name Winlevi, was approved to treat acne in males and females in the United States in 2020. However, although significantly more effective than placebo, topical clascoterone, like previous topical antiandrogens that have been developed, showed modest effectiveness in treating acne in clinical trials, and it appeared to be far less effective than systemic spironolactone.

=== Male contraception ===
Antiandrogens, such as cyproterone acetate, have been studied for potential use as male hormonal contraceptives. While effective in suppressing male fertility, their use as monotherapies is precluded by side effects, such as androgen deficiency (e.g., demasculinization, sexual dysfunction, hot flashes, osteoporosis) and feminization (e.g., gynecomastia). The combination of a primary antigonadotropin such as cyproterone acetate to prevent fertility and an androgen like testosterone to prevent systemic androgen deficiency, resulting in a selective antiandrogenic action locally in the testes, has been extensively studied and has shown promising results, but has not been approved for clinical use at this time. Dimethandrolone undecanoate (developmental code name CDB-4521), an orally active dual AAS and progestogen, is under investigation as a potential male contraceptive and as the first male birth control pill.

=== Breast cancer ===
Antiandrogens such as bicalutamide, enzalutamide, and abiraterone acetate are under investigation for the potential treatment of breast cancer, including AR-expressing triple-negative breast cancer and other types of AR-expressing breast cancer.

=== Miscellaneous ===
Antiandrogens might be effective and useful in the treatment of obsessive–compulsive disorder (OCD).

== See also ==
- Androgen insensitivity syndrome
- Antiandrogens in the environment
- Androgen replacement therapy
