= Trimethyltrienolone =

Chemical compound

Clinical data
- Other names: TMT; R-2956; RU-2956; 2α,2β,17α-Trimethyltrienolone; 2α,2β,17α-Trimethyltrenbolone; 2α,2β-Dimethylmetribolone; δ^{9,11}-2α,2β,17α-trimethyl-19-nortestosterone; 2α,2β,17α-Trimethylestra-4,9,11-trien-17β-ol-3-one; 17β-Hydroxy-2α,2β,17α-trimethylestra-4,9,11-trien-3-one
- Drug class: Steroidal antiandrogen
- ATC code: None

Identifiers
- IUPAC name: (8R,13S,14S,17R)-17-hydroxy-2,2,13,17-tetramethyl-6,7,8,14,15,16-hexahydro-1H-cyclopenta[a]phenanthren-3-one
- CAS Number: 23983-19-9
- PubChem CID: 170652
- ChemSpider: 149197
- CompTox Dashboard (EPA): DTXSID80962490

Chemical and physical data
- Formula: C_{21}H_{28}O_{2}
- Molar mass: 312.453 g·mol^{−1}
- 3D model (JSmol): Interactive image
- SMILES: CC1(CC2=C3C=CC4(C(C3CCC2=CC1=O)CCC4(C)O)C)C
- InChI: InChI=1S/C21H28O2/c1-19(2)12-16-13(11-18(19)22)5-6-15-14(16)7-9-20(3)17(15)8-10-21(20,4)23/h7,9,11,15,17,23H,5-6,8,10,12H2,1-4H3/t15-,17-,20-,21+/m0/s1; Key:VFKZTCQVCJGPGF-STRKUORWSA-N

Trimethyltrienolone (TMT), also known by its developmental code name R-2956 or RU-2956, is an antiandrogen medication which was never introduced for medical use but has been used in scientific research.

== Side effects ==
Due to its close relation to metribolone (methyltrienolone), it is thought that TMT may produce hepatotoxicity.

== Pharmacology ==
=== Pharmacodynamics ===
TMT is a selective and highly potent competitive antagonist of the androgen receptor (AR) with very low intrinsic/partial androgenic activity and no estrogenic, antiestrogenic, progestogenic, or antimineralocorticoid activity. The drug is a derivative of the extremely potent androgen/anabolic steroid metribolone (R-1881; 17α-methyltrenbolone), and has been reported to possess only about 4-fold lower affinity for the AR in comparison. In accordance, it has relatively high affinity for the AR among steroidal antiandrogens, and almost completely inhibits dihydrotestosterone (DHT) binding to the AR in vitro at a mere 10-fold molar excess. The AR weak partial agonistic activity of TMT is comparable to that of cyproterone acetate.

Relative affinities (%) of TMT and related steroids
Compound	PR	AR	ER	GR	MR
Testosterone	1–3, 1–5	100	<1	<1, 1–5	<1
5α-Dihydrotestosterone	<1, 1–3	100–125	<1	<1	<1
Metribolone (RU-1881)	200–300, 250–600	200–300, 250–600	<1	25–50	15–25
Trimethyltrienolone (RU-2956)	≤1	14	<1	<1	<1
Notes: Values are percentages (%). Reference ligands (100%) were progesterone for the PR, testosterone for the AR, E2 for the ER, DEXA for the GR, and aldosterone for the MR. Sources:

== Chemistry ==
TMT, also known as 2α,2β,17α-trimethyltrienolone or as δ^{9,11}-2α,2β,17α-trimethyl-19-nortestosterone, as well as 2α,2β,17α-trimethylestra-4,9,11-trien-17β-ol-3-one, is a synthetic estrane steroid and a derivative of testosterone and 19-nortestosterone. It is the 2α,2β,17α-trimethyl derivative of trenbolone (trienolone) and the 2α,2β-dimethyl derivative of metribolone (methyltrienolone), both of which are synthetic androgens/anabolic steroids.

== History ==
TMT was developed by Roussel Uclaf in France and was first known as early as 1969. It was one of the earliest antiandrogens to be discovered and developed, along with others such as benorterone, BOMT, cyproterone, and cyproterone acetate. The drug was under investigation by Roussel Uclaf for potential medical use, but was abandoned in favor of nonsteroidal antiandrogens like flutamide and nilutamide due to their comparative advantage of a complete lack of androgenicity. Roussel Uclaf subsequently developed and introduced nilutamide for medical use.
