= RU-22930 =

Chemical compound

Clinical data
- Other names: 5,6-Dihydro-2-methyl-4-[4-nitro-3-(trifluoromethyl)phenyl]-2H-1,2,4-oxadiazin-3-(4H)-one
- Drug class: Nonsteroidal antiandrogen

Identifiers
- IUPAC name: 2-Methyl-4-[4-nitro-3-(trifluoromethyl)phenyl]-1,2,4-oxadiazinan-3-one
- CAS Number: 63094-42-8
- PubChem CID: 9948430
- ChemSpider: 8124041
- UNII: 99QTV3S3MG
- CompTox Dashboard (EPA): DTXSID501336998

Chemical and physical data
- Formula: C_{11}H_{10}F_{3}N_{3}O_{4}
- Molar mass: 305.213 g·mol^{−1}
- 3D model (JSmol): Interactive image
- SMILES: CN1OCCN(C1=O)C1=CC=C(C(=C1)C(F)(F)F)N(=O)=O
- InChI: InChI=1S/C11H10F3N3O4/c1-15-10(18)16(4-5-21-15)7-2-3-9(17(19)20)8(6-7)11(12,13)14/h2-3,6H,4-5H2,1H3; Key:SQAORNVRAYTOMS-UHFFFAOYSA-N

RU-22930 is a nonsteroidal antiandrogen (NSAA) related to the NSAAs flutamide and nilutamide (RU-23908) and was developed by Roussel Uclaf but was never marketed. It is a selective antagonist of the androgen receptor and consequently has progonadotropic effects by increasing gonadotropin and testosterone levels via disinhibition of the hypothalamic-pituitary-gonadal axis. Unlike flutamide and nilutamide, the drug is said to be short-acting and inactive by injection, but it has been found to be active topically in animals, and hence could be useful for the treatment of androgen-dependent skin conditions.

== See also ==
- RU-58642
- RU-58841
