= C18H26O3 =

The molecular formula C_{18}H_{26}O_{3} (molar mass: 290.40 g/mol) may refer to:

- Inocoterone acetate, nonsteroidal antiandrogen
- Isanolic acid, rare fatty acid
- Octyl methoxycinnamate, a sunscreen ingredient
- Oxabolone, an anabolic steroid
