= C25H34O5 =

The molecular formula C_{25}H_{34}O_{5} (molar mass: 414.53 g/mol, exact mass: 414.2406 u) may refer to:

- 9,11-Dehydrocortexolone 17α-butyrate
- THC hemisuccinate
