= 9,11-Dehydrocortexolone 17α-butyrate =

Chemical compound

Clinical data
- Other names: CB-03-04; 17α-(Butyryloxy)-9,11-didehydrodeoxycorticosterone; 17α-Butanoyloxy-21-hydroxypregna-4,9(11)-diene-3,20-dione

Identifiers
- IUPAC name: [(8S,10S,13S,14S,17R)-17-(2-hydroxyacetyl)-10,13-dimethyl-3-oxo-2,6,7,8,12,14,15,16-octahydro-1H-cyclopenta[a]phenanthren-17-yl] butanoate
- CAS Number: 872623-99-9
- PubChem CID: 11704352
- ChemSpider: 9879075
- UNII: 88D1Y5GBH5
- ChEMBL: ChEMBL3588895
- CompTox Dashboard (EPA): DTXSID501191403

Chemical and physical data
- Formula: C_{25}H_{34}O_{5}
- Molar mass: 414.542 g·mol^{−1}
- 3D model (JSmol): Interactive image
- SMILES: CCCC(=O)O[C@@]1(CC[C@@H]2[C@@]1(CC=C3[C@H]2CCC4=CC(=O)CC[C@@]43C)C)C(=O)CO
- InChI: InChI=1S/C25H34O5/c1-4-5-22(29)30-25(21(28)15-26)13-10-20-18-7-6-16-14-17(27)8-11-23(16,2)19(18)9-12-24(20,25)3/h9,14,18,20,26H,4-8,10-13,15H2,1-3H3/t18-,20+,23+,24+,25+/m1/s1; Key:IMSKTQNPYUKZMB-AMMWCUJOSA-N

9,11-Dehydrocortexolone 17α-butyrate (developmental code name CB-03-04) is a synthetic steroidal antiandrogen that was developed for use as a topical medication but was never marketed. It is the C17α butyrate (butanoate) ester of the 9,11-dehydrogenated analogue of 11-deoxycortisol (cortexolone). C17α esters of 11-deoxycortisol were unexpectedly found to possess antiandrogen activity, and 9,11-dehydrocortexolone 17α-butyrate was selected for development based on its optimum drug profile. In rats, the drug has been found to possess strong local antiandrogen activity and to also be active systemically upon subcutaneous injection. In addition, it has been found to possess antigonadotropic activity. In terms of topical antiandrogen potency, 9,11-dehydrocortexolone 17α-butyrate was found to be more potent than flutamide and finasteride and less than or equal to cyproterone acetate in potency. The drug has been suggested for possible development and medical use for the treatment of prostate cancer and benign prostatic hyperplasia.

== See also ==
- Clascoterone (cortexolone 17α-propionate; CB-03-01)
- List of steroidal antiandrogens
