= Nordinone =

Names
- IUPAC name 11α-Hydroxy-10,17,17-trimethylgonane-4,13-dien-3-one
- Systematic IUPAC name (3bR,9aR,9bS,10R)-10-Hydroxy-1,1,9a-trimethyl-1,2,3,3b,4,5,8,9,9a,9b,10,11-dodecahydro-7H-cyclopenta[a]phenanthren-7-one

Identifiers
CAS Number	33122-60-0
3D model (JSmol)	Interactive image
ChemSpider	2298522
PubChem CID	3033958
UNII	76FQ40X1XH
CompTox Dashboard (EPA)	DTXSID70186784
- InChI: InChI=1S/C20H28O2/c1-19(2)8-7-14-15-5-4-12-10-13(21)6-9-20(12,3)18(15)17(22)11-16(14)19/h10,15,17-18,22H,4-9,11H2,1-3H3/t15-,17+,18+,20-/m0/s1 Key: ALFAUJVLIRDQGD-MMTROXRISA-N
- SMILES: C[C@]12CCC(=O)C=C1CC[C@@H]3[C@@H]2[C@@H](CC4=C3CCC4(C)C)O

Properties
Chemical formula	C_{20}H_{28}O_{2}
Molar mass	300.442 g·mol^{−1}
- Except where otherwise noted, data are given for materials in their standard state (at 25 °C [77 °F], 100 kPa). Infobox references

Nordinone (INN), also known as 11α-hydroxy-17,17-dimethyl-18-norandrosta-4,13-dien-3-one, is a naturally occurring steroid with antiandrogen properties isolated as a metabolite from the fungus Monocillium nordinii.
