= Cyproterone =

Chemical compound

Clinical data
- Other names: SH-80881; SH-881; NSC-758636; 1α,2α-Methylene-6-chloro-17α-hydroxy-δ^{6}-progesterone; 1α,2α-Methylene-6-chloro-17α-hydroxypregna-4,6-diene-3,20-dione
- Routes of administration: By mouth, topical
- Drug class: Steroidal antiandrogen
- ATC code: G03HA01 (WHO)

Identifiers
- IUPAC name: (1S,2S,3S,5R,11R,12S,15R,16S)-15-acetyl-9-chloro-15-hydroxy-2,16-dimethylpentacyclo[9.7.0.0^{2,8}.0^{3,5}.0^{12,16}]octadeca-7,9-dien-6-one
- CAS Number: 2098-66-0
- PubChem CID: 5284537
- ChemSpider: 4447594
- UNII: E61Q31EK2F
- ChEMBL: ChEMBL142130
- CompTox Dashboard (EPA): DTXSID3022873
- ECHA InfoCard: 100.218.313

Chemical and physical data
- Formula: C_{22}H_{27}ClO_{3}
- Molar mass: 374.91 g·mol^{−1}
- 3D model (JSmol): Interactive image
- SMILES: CC(=O)[C@]1(CC[C@@H]2[C@@]1(CC[C@H]3[C@H]2C=C(C4=CC(=O)[C@@H]5C[C@@H]5[C@]34C)Cl)C)O
- InChI: InChI=1S/C22H27ClO3/c1-11(24)22(26)7-5-14-12-9-18(23)17-10-19(25)13-8-16(13)21(17,3)15(12)4-6-20(14,22)2/h9-10,12-16,26H,4-8H2,1-3H3/t12-,13+,14-,15-,16-,20-,21-,22-/m0/s1; Key:DUSHUSLJJMDGTE-ZJPMUUANSA-N

Cyproterone, also known by its developmental code name SH-80881, is a steroidal antiandrogen which was studied in the 1960s and 1970s but was never introduced for medical use. It is a precursor of cyproterone acetate (CPA), an antiandrogen, progestin, and antigonadotropin which was introduced instead of cyproterone and is widely used as a medication. Cyproterone and CPA were among the first antiandrogens to be developed.

The term cyproterone is often used as a synonym and shorthand for cyproterone acetate, and when the term occurs, what is almost always being referred to is, confusingly, CPA and not actually cyproterone. Cyproterone itself, unlike CPA, was never introduced for medical use and hence is not available as a medication.

== Pharmacology ==
=== Pharmacodynamics ===
==== Antiandrogenic activity ====
Cyproterone is a potent antiandrogen, similarly to CPA. However, it has approximately three-fold lower potency as an antagonist of the androgen receptor (AR) relative to CPA. Like CPA, cyproterone is actually a weak partial agonist of the AR, and hence has the potential for both antiandrogenic and androgenic activity in some contexts. Unlike CPA (which is a highly potent progestogen), cyproterone is a pure antiandrogen and is virtually devoid of progestogenic activity. As such, it is not an antigonadotropin, and is actually progonadotropic in males, increasing gonadotropin and testosterone levels due to inhibition of AR-mediated negative feedback on the hypothalamic–pituitary–gonadal axis.

Due to its progonadotropic effects in males, unlike CPA, cyproterone has been found, in male rodents, to increase testicular weight, increase the total number of type A spermatogonia, increase the total number of Sertoli cells, hyperstimulate the Leydig cells, and to have almost no effect on spermatogenesis. Conversely, it has also been reported for male rodents that spermiogenesis is inhibited and that accessory sexual gland weights (e.g., prostate gland, seminal vesicles) and fertility were markedly reduced, although with rapid recovery from the changes upon cessation of treatment. In any case, the medication is said to not be an effective antispermatogenic agent, whereas CPA is effective. Also unlike CPA, due to its lack of progestogenic and antigonadotropic activity, cyproterone does not suppress ovulation in women.

==== Other activities ====
Both CPA and, to a smaller extent, cyproterone possess some weak glucocorticoid activity and suppress adrenal gland and spleen weight in animals, with CPA having about one-fifth the potency of prednisone in mice. Unlike CPA, cyproterone seems to show some inhibition of 17β-hydroxysteroid dehydrogenase and 5α-reductase in vitro. In contrast to CPA, cyproterone shows no affinity for opioid receptors.

== Chemistry ==
Cyproterone, also known as 1α,2α-methylene-6-chloro-17α-hydroxy-δ^{6}-progesterone or as 1α,2α-methylene-6-chloro-17α-hydroxypregna-4,6-diene-3,20-dione, is a synthetic pregnane steroid and a derivative of progesterone. It is the free alcohol or 17α-deacetylated analogue of CPA.

== History ==
Cyproterone, along with CPA, was first patented in 1962, with subsequent patents in 1963 and 1965. It was studied clinically between 1967 and 1972. Unlike CPA, the medication was never marketed for medical use. Cyproterone was the first pure antiandrogen to be developed, with other closely following examples of this class including the steroidal antiandrogens benorterone and BOMT and the nonsteroidal antiandrogen flutamide.

== Society and culture ==
=== Generic names ===
Cyproterone is the generic name of the drug and its INN. It is also known by the developmental code names SH-80881 and SH-881.

== Research ==
In clinical studies, cyproterone was found to be far less potent and effective as an antiandrogen than CPA, likely in significant part due to its lack of concomitant antigonadotropic action. Cyproterone was studied as a treatment for precocious puberty by Bierich (1970, 1971), but no significant improvement was observed. In men, 100 mg/day cyproterone proved to be rather ineffective in treating acne, which was hypothesized to be related to its progonadotropic effects in males and counteraction of its antiandrogen activity. In women however, who have much lower levels of testosterone and in whom the medication has no progonadotropic activity, 100 to 200 mg/day oral cyproterone was effective in reducing sebum production in all patients as early as 2 to 4 weeks following the start of treatment. In contrast, topical cyproterone was far less effective and barely outperformed placebo.

Another study showed disappointing results with 100 mg/day cyproterone for reducing sebum production in women with hyperandrogenism. Similarly, the medication showed disappointing results in the treatment of hirsutism in women, with a distinct hair reduction occurring in only a limited percentage of cases. In the same study, the reduction of acne was better, but was clearly inferior to that produced by CPA, and only the improvement in seborrhea was regarded as satisfactory. The addition of an oral contraceptive to cyproterone resulted in a somewhat better improvement in acne and seborrhea relative to cyproterone alone. According to Jacobs (1979), "[cyproterone] proved to be without clinical value for reasons that cannot be discussed here." In any case, cyproterone has been well tolerated by patients in dosages of up to 300 mg/day.
