= Inocoterone acetate =

Chemical compound

Clinical data
- Other names: RU-38882; RU-882; 2,5-Seco-A-dinorestr-9-en-17β-ol-5-one 17β-acetate
- Drug class: Nonsteroidal antiandrogen

Identifiers
- IUPAC name: [(3S,3aS,9aS,9bS)-6-Ethyl-3a-methyl-7-oxo-2,3,4,5,8,9,9a,9b-octahydro-1H-cyclopenta[a]naphthalen-3-yl] acetate
- CAS Number: 83646-86-0
- PubChem CID: 6917958
- ChemSpider: 5293176
- UNII: ONU02D116S
- KEGG: D04538
- ChEMBL: ChEMBL2107564
- CompTox Dashboard (EPA): DTXSID401003615

Chemical and physical data
- Formula: C_{18}H_{26}O_{3}
- Molar mass: 290.403 g·mol^{−1}
- 3D model (JSmol): Interactive image
- SMILES: CCC1=C2CC[C@]3([C@H]([C@@H]2CCC1=O)CC[C@@H]3OC(=O)C)C
- InChI: InChI=1S/C18H26O3/c1-4-12-13-9-10-18(3)15(14(13)5-7-16(12)20)6-8-17(18)21-11(2)19/h14-15,17H,4-10H2,1-3H3/t14-,15+,17+,18+/m1/s1; Key:JDLUQDYTLSPFGS-FZCLSBEQSA-N

Inocoterone acetate (USAN; developmental codes RU-38882 and RU-882) is a steroid-like nonsteroidal antiandrogen (NSAA) that was developed for topical administration to treat acne but was never marketed. It is the acetate ester of inocoterone, which is less potent in comparison. Inocoterone acetate is actually not a silent antagonist of the androgen receptor but rather a weak partial agonist, similarly to steroidal antiandrogens like cyproterone acetate.

Inocoterone acetate was investigated for the treatment of acne but showed only modest (albeit statistically significant) efficacy in clinical trials. A reduction of 26% of lesions was observed in males treated with the drug after 16 weeks (~3.7 months). However, this is notably far less than that achieved with other agents such as benzoyl peroxide or antibiotics, which produce 50–75% reductions within 2 months. Similar poor results with the topical route have disappointingly been found for other antiandrogens, such as cyproterone acetate and spironolactone. Similarly to rosterolone, inocoterone acetate has no systemic antiandrogenic activity when applied systemically.

== See also ==
- Steroidal antiandrogen
- List of steroidal antiandrogens
