= Steroidal antiandrogen =

Class of compounds

- Drug class
- Cyproterone acetate, the most widely employed steroidal antiandrogen.

Class identifiers
- Synonyms: Steroidal androgen receptor antagonists
- Use: Prostate cancer; Benign prostatic hyperplasia; Acne; Hirsutism; Seborrhea; Pattern hair loss; Hyperandrogenism; Transgender hormone therapy; Hypersexuality; Paraphilias; Male precocious puberty; Priapism
- ATC code: G03HA
- Biological target: Androgen receptor
- Chemical class: Steroidal

Legal status

A steroidal antiandrogen (SAA) is an antiandrogen with a steroidal chemical structure. They are typically antagonists of the androgen receptor (AR) and act both by blocking the effects of androgens like testosterone and dihydrotestosterone (DHT) and by suppressing gonadal androgen production. SAAs lower concentrations of testosterone through simulation of the negative feedback inhibition of the hypothalamus. SAAs are used in the treatment of androgen-dependent conditions in men and women, and are also used in veterinary medicine for the same purpose. They are the converse of nonsteroidal antiandrogens (NSAAs), which are antiandrogens that are not steroids and are structurally unrelated to testosterone.

== Medical uses ==
SAAs are used in clinical medicine for the following indications:

- Prostate cancer in men
- Benign prostatic hyperplasia in men
- Androgen-dependent skin and hair conditions like acne, hirsutism, seborrhea, and pattern hair loss (androgenic alopecia) in women
- Hyperandrogenism, such as due to polyendocrine metabolic ovarian syndrome (PMOS) or congenital adrenal hyperplasia, in women
- As a component of hormone therapy for transgender women
- Precocious puberty in boys
- Hypersexuality and paraphilias in men and sex offenders
- Priapism in men

=== Available forms ===
Antiandrogens marketed for clinical or veterinary use
Generic name	Class	Type	Brand name(s)	Route(s)	Launch	Status	Hits^{a}
Abiraterone acetate	Steroidal	Androgen synthesis inhibitor	Zytiga	Oral	2011	Available	523,000
Allylestrenol	Steroidal	Progestin	Gestanin, Perselin	Oral	1961	Available^{b}	61,800
Chlormadinone acetate	Steroidal	Progestin; AR antagonist	Belara, Prostal	Oral	1965	Available	220,000
Cyproterone acetate	Steroidal	Progestin; AR antagonist	Androcur, Diane	Oral, IM	1973	Available	461,000
Delmadinone acetate	Steroidal	Progestin; AR antagonist	Tardak	Veterinary	1972	Veterinary	42,600
Gestonorone caproate	Steroidal	Progestin	Depostat, Primostat	IM	1973	Available^{b}	119,000
Hydroxyprogesterone caproate	Steroidal	Progestin	Delalutin, Proluton	IM	1954	Available	108,000
Medroxyprogesterone acetate	Steroidal	Progestin	Provera, Depo-Provera	Oral, IM, SC	1958	Available	1,250,000
Megestrol acetate	Steroidal	Progestin; AR antagonist	Megace	Oral	1963	Available	253,000
Osaterone acetate	Steroidal	Progestin; AR antagonist	Ypozane	Veterinary	2007	Veterinary	87,600
Oxendolone	Steroidal	Progestin; AR antagonist	Prostetin, Roxenone	IM	1981	Available^{b}	36,100
Spironolactone	Steroidal	AR antagonist	Aldactone	Oral, topical	1959	Available	3,010,000
Footnotes: ^{a} = Hits = Google Search hits (as of February 2018). ^{b} = Availability limited / mostly discontinued. Class: Steroidal = Steroidal antiandrogen. Nonsteroidal = Nonsteroidal antiandrogen. Sources: See individual articles.

== Pharmacology ==
Unlike NSAAs, most SAAs show off-target hormonal activity such as progestogenic, glucocorticoid, or antimineralocorticoid activity, possess antigonadotropic effects, and are weak partial agonists of the AR with some capacity to activate the receptor. Due to their antigonadotropic effects, SAAs lower androgen levels in addition to directly blocking the actions of androgens at the AR; at sufficiently high dosages, they are able to lower circulating testosterone levels by up to 70 to 80% in men, to just above the castrate range. However, due to their other hormonal effects, suppression of estrogen levels alongside testosterone levels, and AR activation, SAAs have increased side effects and show lower efficacy in the treatment of prostate cancer relative to NSAAs.

== List of SAAs ==
=== Marketed ===
==== Used specifically as antiandrogens (major) ====
- Cyproterone acetate (Androcur): A combined AR antagonist and progestogen/antigonadotropin. Also has weak glucocorticoid activity. Previously used widely in the treatment of prostate cancer, but since largely replaced by NSAAs. Also used for androgen-dependent indications in women and transgender women, precocious puberty in boys, and as a means of chemical castration for sexual deviation in men. Widely used in oral contraceptives as well (with ethinylestradiol under the brand names Diane and Diane-35). Not available in the United States. Uniquely among most SAAs, has a high risk of liver changes and hepatotoxicity. Also has a high incidence of psychiatric side effects such as depression, anxiety, and fatigue.
- Spironolactone (Aldactone): An antimineralocorticoid (aldosterone antagonist) with additional/coincidental antiandrogen activity. Specifically acts as an AR antagonist, weak antigonadotropin, and weak steroidogenesis inhibitor. Used for androgen-dependent indications in women and transgender women, particularly in the United States where cyproterone acetate is unavailable. Studied in the treatment of benign prostatic hyperplasia but was found to be ineffective. Contraindicated in prostate cancer due to weak androgenic activity and stimulation of tumor growth. Most commonly used as a diuretic and antihypertensive for cardiovascular disease. Commonly associated with gynecomastia (breast development) and menstrual disturbances.

==== Used specifically as antiandrogens (minor) ====
- Chlormadinone acetate (Prostal): A combined AR antagonist and progestogen/antigonadotropin. Also has weak glucocorticoid activity. Widely used in the treatment of prostate cancer in Japan, but little used for this purpose elsewhere. Has largely been replaced by NSAAs. Mostly used throughout the world in oral contraceptives (with ethinylestradiol under the brand names Belara and Belarina). Not available in the United States.
- Gestonorone caproate (Depostat, Primostat): A pure progestogen/antigonadotropin without any direct AR antagonism or other hormonal activity. Injected intramuscularly. Used in the treatment of benign prostatic hyperplasia in certain countries such as the United Kingdom. Not available in the United States.
- Hydroxyprogesterone caproate (Proluton, Proluton Depot): A pure progestogen/antigonadotropin without any direct AR antagonism or other hormonal activity. Injected intramuscularly. Studied in the treatment of benign prostatic hyperplasia and showed some albeit only marginal effectiveness. Associated with hypogonadism and causes impotence in two-thirds of men. Mostly used for gynecological and obstetric indications in women.
- Medrogestone (Colprone): A progestogen/antigonadotropin with additional activity as an AR antagonist and steroidogenesis inhibitor. Also has weak glucocorticoid activity. Formerly used in the treatment of benign prostatic hyperplasia in men. Most commonly used in the treatment of gynecological disorders and in menopause. It is an older progestin that has mostly been discontinued and is now rarely used.
- Medroxyprogesterone acetate (Depo-Provera): A progestogen/antigonadotropin without any direct AR antagonism. Also has weak androgenic and glucocorticoid activity and acts as a steroidogenesis inhibitor at very high dosages. Injected intramuscularly. Used as a means of chemical castration for sexual deviation in men, particularly in the United States where cyproterone acetate is unavailable. Studied in the treatment of prostate cancer but never widely used. Has also been used to prevent precocious puberty. Most commonly used as a long-lasting injectable contraceptive in women.
- Megestrol acetate (Megace): A combined AR partial antagonist and progestogen/antigonadotropin. Also has weak androgenic and glucocorticoid activity. Studied in the treatment of prostate cancer but showed poor effectiveness. Mostly used as an appetite stimulant in patients with cachexia.
- Oxendolone (Prostetin, Roxenone): A combined AR antagonist and progestogen/antigonadotropin. Marketed in Japan only for the treatment of benign prostatic hyperplasia. Controversial due to low effectiveness observed in clinical studies.

==== Used as antiandrogens in veterinary medicine ====
- Delmadinone acetate (Tardak): A combined AR antagonist and progestogen/antigonadotropin. Also has weak glucocorticoid activity. Used in veterinary medicine only. Marketed in Europe and Oceania for the treatment of androgen-dependent conditions such as benign prostatic hyperplasia in dogs.
- Osaterone acetate (Ypozane): A combined AR antagonist and progestogen/antigonadotropin. Used in veterinary medicine only. Marketed in Europe specifically for the treatment of benign prostatic hyperplasia in dogs. Has been associated with transiently elevated liver enzymes.

==== Used exclusively as progestins in women ====
- Dienogest (Visanne, Dinagest): Progestin with some AR antagonist activity. Used as an oral contraceptive (with estradiol valerate as Natazia and Qlaira and with ethinylestradiol as Valette) and in the treatment of endometriosis.
- Drospirenone: Progestin with antimineralocorticoid and AR antagonist activity. Used in combination with estrogen in hormonal replacement therapy and oral contraceptives (with ethinylestradiol as Yasmin, Yasminelle, and Yaz and with estradiol as Angeliq). Also used (as an oral contraceptive) in the treatment of acne.
- Nomegestrol acetate (Lutenyl): Progestin with AR antagonist activity. Used in the treatment of gynecological disorders and in hormonal replacement therapy and oral contraceptives (with estradiol as Naemis and Zoely).

==== Miscellaneous ====
- Mifepristone (RU-486; Mifegyne, Mifeprex): An antiprogestogen which is widely used as an abortifacient. Also has antiglucocorticoid and AR antagonist activity. Has been found to produce gynecomastia as a side effect in men at a relatively high rate in clinical studies. Has been studied as a treatment for prostate cancer.

Steroidal androgen synthesis inhibitors like the CYP17A1 inhibitor abiraterone acetate (Zytiga) or the 5α-reductase inhibitors finasteride and dutasteride could also technically be described as "SAAs", but the term is usually reserved to describe AR antagonists (and sometimes progestogenic antigonadotropins).

=== Not marketed ===
==== Under development ====
- Clascoterone (CB-03-01; Breezula, Winlevi): A pure AR antagonist. Topical without any systemic activity. Under development for the treatment of acne and pattern hair loss (androgenic alopecia).

==== Development discontinued ====
- 11α-Hydroxyprogesterone (11α-OHP): Possibly the first antiandrogen to be discovered. Weak antiandrogen used topically. Studied in the 1950s for the treatment of androgen-dependent skin conditions like acne and reportedly showed some effectiveness but was never marketed.
- Benorterone (SKF-7690, FC-612): A pure AR antagonist without progestogenic activity, though with some antigonadotropic activity through an undefined mechanism. One of the earliest antiandrogens. Studied in the treatment of acne, seborrhea, and hirsutism in the 1960s but was found to produce a very high rate of gynecomastia in males. Development was discontinued in favor of cyproterone acetate, which showed only a low rate of gynecomastia in males.
- BOMT (Ro 7-2340): A pure AR antagonist without other progestogenic activity, though with some antigonadotropic activity through an undefined mechanism. One of the earliest antiandrogens. Studied in the treatment of benign prostatic hyperplasia but was never marketed. Was also of interest for the potential treatment of acne, pattern hair loss (androgenic alopecia), and prostate cancer, but was never studied for such uses.
- Cyproterone (SH-80881, SH-881): A pure AR antagonist without progestogenic activity, showing robust progonadotropic activity like NSAAs. One of the earliest antiandrogens. Was studied in the treatment of precocious puberty as well as acne, seborrhea, and hirsutism. Showed surprisingly poor effectiveness in clinical trials and was abandoned in favor of cyproterone acetate.
- Delanterone (GBR-21162): An AR antagonist which was described in the literature in 1977. Was under development for the treatment of acne but showed poor effectiveness in preclinical studies and was abandoned.
- Galeterone (TOK-001, VN/124-1): A dual AR antagonist and steroidogenesis inhibitor which was under development for the treatment of prostate cancer but showed insufficient effectiveness in clinical trials and was discontinued.
- Inocoterone acetate (RU-38882, RU-882): A steroid-like NSAA. It was under development as a topical medication for the treatment of acne but was discontinued due to insufficient effectiveness in clinical trials.
- Metogest (SC-14207): An AR antagonist which was patented in 1975 and briefly investigated for the treatment of acne but was never marketed.
- Rosterolone (SH-434): A pure AR antagonist without other hormonal activity. Developed as a topical antiandrogen without systemic activity. Showed some effectiveness in the treatment of acne, but was never marketed.
- Topterone (WIN-17665): An AR antagonist which was described in the literature in 1977. Developed as a topical antiandrogen. Was under development for the treatment of acne but showed poor effectiveness and was abandoned.
- Trimethyltrienolone (R-2956): An extremely potent AR antagonist without other hormonal activity derived from the powerful anabolic–androgenic steroid metribolone (methyltrienolone). Was under investigation for potential clinical use but development was discontinued in favor of NSAAs, which in contrast show a complete lack of intrinsic androgenic activity.
- Zanoterone (WIN-49596): A pure AR antagonist without other hormonal activity except some antiprogestogenic activity in animal models. Was under development for the treatment of benign prostatic hyperplasia but showed poor effectiveness and a high rate of breast pain and gynecomastia in clinical trials and was subsequently abandoned.
- Many spirolactone antimineralocorticoids that were never marketed like dicirenone, mespirenone, mexrenone, prorenone, SC-5233 (spirolactone), spirorenone, and spiroxasone also show varying degrees of activity as AR antagonists.

== See also ==
- Discovery and development of antiandrogens
- List of steroidal antiandrogens
