= BOMT =

Chemical compound

Clinical data
- Other names: Ro 7-2340; 6α-Bromo-4-oxa-17α-methyl-5α-dihydrotestosterone; 6α-Bromo-4-oxa-17α-methyl-5α-androstan-17β-ol-3-one
- Routes of administration: By mouth
- Drug class: Steroidal antiandrogen
- ATC code: None

Identifiers
- IUPAC name: (1S,3aS,3bR,5S,5aS,9aR,9bS,11aS)-5-Bromo-1-hydroxy-1,9a,11a-trimethyl-2,3,3a,3b,4,5,5a,8,9,9b,10,11-dodecahydroindeno[5,4-f]chromen-7-one
- CAS Number: 24543-59-7 24543-66-6
- PubChem CID: 159972
- ChemSpider: 140636
- CompTox Dashboard (EPA): DTXSID80947424

Chemical and physical data
- Formula: C_{19}H_{29}BrO_{3}
- Molar mass: 385.342 g·mol^{−1}
- 3D model (JSmol): Interactive image
- SMILES: CC12CCC(=O)OC1C(CC3C2CCC4(C3CCC4(C)O)C)Br
- InChI: InChI=1S/C19H29BrO3/c1-17-7-6-15(21)23-16(17)14(20)10-11-12(17)4-8-18(2)13(11)5-9-19(18,3)22/h11-14,16,22H,4-10H2,1-3H3/t11-,12+,13+,14+,16-,17-,18+,19+/m1/s1; Key:ZUIGZKIOHUNINA-LWPUPYOYSA-N

BOMT, also known by its developmental code name Ro 7-2340 and as 6α-bromo-4-oxa-17α-methyl-5α-dihydrotestosterone, is a synthetic steroidal antiandrogen which was first produced in 1970 and was never marketed for medical use. It is the 6α-brominated, 4-oxygenated, and 17α-methylated derivative of the androgen dihydrotestosterone (DHT). Along with benorterone, cyproterone (and its C17α acetate ester, cyproterone acetate), and flutamide, BOMT was among the earliest antiandrogens to be developed and extensively studied, although it is less well-documented in comparison to the others. BOMT has been investigated clinically in the treatment of benign prostatic hyperplasia, though development for this use did not continue. There was also interest in BOMT for the potential applications of acne, pattern hair loss, and possibly prostate cancer, but it was not developed for these indications either.

BOMT is a selective competitive antagonist of the androgen receptor (AR), although it is described as an "only relatively weak competitor." The relative binding affinity of the drug for the androgen receptor is about 2.7% of that of metribolone. BOMT shows no androgenic, estrogenic, or progestogenic activity even at high doses, nor any inhibition of 5α-reductase, though it has been reported to possess weak antigonadotropic effects. Due to its selectivity for and competitive inhibition of the AR, BOMT has been described as a pure or "true" antiandrogen, similarly to benorterone, cyproterone, and flutamide. Like other steroidal antiandrogens, BOMT may actually be a weak partial agonist of the AR, as it appears to have the potential for weak androgenic effects in specific situations. On the basis of animal research, BOMT does not appear to act as an AR antagonist in central nervous system tissues, and in relation to this, does not disinhibit the hypothalamic–pituitary–gonadal axis or increase testosterone levels.

== See also ==
- List of steroidal antiandrogens
