= Osaterone acetate =

Chemical compound

Osaterone acetate INN: Osaterone

Clinical data
- Trade names: Ypozane
- Other names: TZP-4238; Gestoxarone acetate; 2-Oxachloromadinone acetate; 17α-Acetoxy-6-chloro-2-oxa-6-dehydroprogesterone; 17α-Acetoxy-6-chloro-2-oxapregna-4,6-diene-3,20-dione
- Routes of administration: By mouth (tablets)
- Drug class: Steroidal antiandrogen; Progestogen; Progestin; Progestogen ester
- ATC code: None

Legal status
- Legal status: EU: Rx-only

Pharmacokinetic data
- Protein binding: Osaterone acetate: 90% 15β-Hydroxyosaterone acetate: 80% (Both mainly to albumin)
- Metabolism: Liver
- Metabolites: 15β-Hydroxyosaterone acetate
- Elimination half-life: Dogs: 80 hours to 197 ± 109 hours
- Excretion: Bile: 60% Urine: 25%

Identifiers
- IUPAC name: [(1R,3aS,3bR,9aR,9bS,11aS)-1-acetyl-5-chloro-9a,11a-dimethyl-7-oxo-2,3,3a,3b,9,9b,10,11-octahydroindeno[4,5-h]isochromen-1-yl] acetate
- CAS Number: 105149-00-6
- PubChem CID: 114992
- ChemSpider: 102924
- UNII: FR26FSV5EZ
- KEGG: D11105
- CompTox Dashboard (EPA): DTXSID501030455
- ECHA InfoCard: 100.215.750

Chemical and physical data
- Formula: C_{22}H_{27}ClO_{5}
- Molar mass: 406.90 g·mol^{−1}
- 3D model (JSmol): Interactive image
- SMILES: CC(=O)C1(CCC2C1(CCC3C2C=C(C4=CC(=O)OCC34C)Cl)C)OC(=O)C
- InChI: InChI=1S/C22H27ClO5/c1-12(24)22(28-13(2)25)8-6-16-14-9-18(23)17-10-19(26)27-11-20(17,3)15(14)5-7-21(16,22)4/h9-10,14-16H,5-8,11H2,1-4H3/t14-,15+,16+,20-,21+,22+/m1/s1; Key:KKTIOMQDFOYCEN-OFUYBIASSA-N

Osaterone acetate, sold under the brand name Ypozane, is a medication which is used in veterinary medicine for the treatment of enlarged prostate in dogs. It is given by mouth.

Osaterone acetate is an antiandrogen, and hence is an antagonist of the androgen receptor, the biological target of androgens like testosterone and dihydrotestosterone. It is also a progestin, or a synthetic progestogen, and hence is an agonist of the progesterone receptor, the biological target of progestogens like progesterone.

Osaterone acetate was introduced for veterinary use in 2007.

== Uses ==
=== Veterinary ===
Osaterone acetate is used in veterinary medicine for the treatment of benign prostatic hyperplasia (BPH) in dogs. It has been found to produce remission of clinical symptoms of BPH in 83% of dogs for six months after a single one-week course of treatment, and can be used long-term.

=== Available forms ===
Osaterone acetate comes in the form of 1.875 mg, 3.75 mg, 7.5 mg, and 15 mg oral tablets for veterinary use.

== Side effects ==
Side effects of osaterone acetate include diminished sperm quality (for up to 6 weeks post-treatment), transient elevation of liver enzymes (caution should be observed with known liver disease), vomiting, diarrhea, polyuria/polydipsia, lethargy, and hyperplasia of the mammary glands. It can also decrease cortisol levels, interfere with adrenocorticotropic hormone response, induce or exacerbate adrenal insufficiency, and exacerbate diabetes mellitus.

== Pharmacology ==
=== Pharmacodynamics ===
Osaterone acetate is a steroidal antiandrogen, progestin, and antigonadotropin. It has virtually no estrogenic or androgenic activity. Its side-effect profile indicates that it possesses clinically relevant glucocorticoid activity. An active metabolite of osaterone acetate, 15β-hydroxyosaterone acetate, has potent antiandrogenic activity similarly to osaterone acetate. Osaterone acetate treats BPH in dogs by reducing the actions of androgens in the prostate gland.

=== Pharmacokinetics ===
The major active metabolite of osaterone acetate is 15β-hydroxyosaterone acetate. Osaterone acetate has a long biological half-life of 80 hours to 197 ± 109 hours in dogs.

== Chemistry ==
Osaterone acetate, also known as 2-oxachloromadinone acetate, as well as 17α-acetoxy-6-chloro-2-oxa-6-dehydroprogesterone or 17α-acetoxy-6-chloro-2-oxapregna-4,6-diene-3,20-dione, is a synthetic pregnane steroid and a derivative of progesterone and 17α-hydroxyprogesterone. It is a derivative of the less potent chlormadinone acetate. The medication is the C17α acetate ester of osaterone.

== History ==
Osaterone acetate was approved for veterinary use in the European Union under the brand name Ypozane in 2007.

== Society and culture ==
=== Generic names ===
Osaterone acetate is the generic name of the drug. Osaterone is the INN of the deacetylated parent compound.

=== Brand names ===
Osaterone acetate is marketed under the brand name Ypozane by Virbac throughout the European Union.

== Research ==
Osaterone acetate was also investigated in Japan in the treatment of prostate cancer and BPH in humans but was ultimately never marketed for such purposes.
