= Delanterone =

Chemical compound

Clinical data
- Other names: GBR-21162; 1α-Methylandrosta-4,16-dien-3-one

Identifiers
- IUPAC name: (1S,8S,9S,10R,13R,14S)-1,10,13-trimethyl-1,2,6,7,8,9,11,12,14,15-decahydrocyclopenta[a]phenanthren-3-one
- CAS Number: 63014-96-0
- PubChem CID: 205969
- ChemSpider: 178468
- UNII: AM2KZ47R0J
- ChEMBL: ChEMBL2104221
- CompTox Dashboard (EPA): DTXSID401024291

Chemical and physical data
- Formula: C_{20}H_{28}O
- Molar mass: 284.443 g·mol^{−1}
- 3D model (JSmol): Interactive image
- SMILES: CC1CC(=O)C=C2C1(C3CCC4(C=CCC4C3CC2)C)C
- InChI: InChI=1S/C20H28O/c1-13-11-15(21)12-14-6-7-16-17-5-4-9-19(17,2)10-8-18(16)20(13,14)3/h4,9,12-13,16-18H,5-8,10-11H2,1-3H3/t13-,16-,17-,18-,19-,20-/m0/s1; Key:GDONNNQFENTLQC-VWTPSIDOSA-N

Delanterone (INN; development code GBR-21162; also known as 1α-methylandrosta-4,16-dien-3-one) is a steroidal antiandrogen described as an anti-acne agent which was never marketed. The compound showed poor efficacy as an antiandrogen in vivo in animals, suggestive of low activity or a short terminal half-life, and likely in relation to this was not further developed. It was described and characterized in the literature in 1977.

== See also ==
- Steroidal antiandrogen
- List of steroidal antiandrogens
