= Zanoterone =

Chemical compound

Clinical data
- Other names: WIN-49596; (5α,17α)-1'-(methylsulfonyl)-1'-H-pregn-20-yno[3,2-c]pyrazol-17-ol
- Routes of administration: By mouth
- Drug class: Steroidal antiandrogen

Identifiers
- IUPAC name: (1R,3aS,3bR,5aS,10aS,10bS,12aS)-1-ethynyl-10a,12a-dimethyl-8-(methylsulfonyl)-1,2,3,3a,3b,4,5,5a,6,8,10,10a,10b,11,12,12a-hexadecahydrocyclopenta[5,6]naphtho[1,2-f]indazol-1-ol
- CAS Number: 107000-34-0
- PubChem CID: 9844827
- DrugBank: D06357
- ChemSpider: 8020541
- UNII: XQ5V1W49JG
- KEGG: D06357
- ChEMBL: ChEMBL2079581
- CompTox Dashboard (EPA): DTXSID50147873

Chemical and physical data
- Formula: C_{23}H_{32}N_{2}O_{3}S
- Molar mass: 416.58 g·mol^{−1}
- 3D model (JSmol): Interactive image
- SMILES: C[C@]12CC[C@H]3[C@H]([C@@H]1CC[C@]2(C#C)O)CC[C@@H]4[C@@]3(CC5=CN(N=C5C4)S(=O)(=O)C)C
- InChI: InChI=1S/C23H32N2O3S/c1-5-23(26)11-9-19-17-7-6-16-12-20-15(14-25(24-20)29(4,27)28)13-21(16,2)18(17)8-10-22(19,23)3/h1,14,16-19,26H,6-13H2,2-4H3/t16-,17+,18-,19-,21-,22-,23-/m0/s1; Key:MHDDZDPNIDVLNK-ZGIWMXSJSA-N

Zanoterone (INN, USAN) (former developmental code name WIN-49596), also known as (5α,17α)-1'-(methylsulfonyl)-1'-H-pregn-20-yno[3,2-c]pyrazol-17-ol, is a steroidal antiandrogen which was never marketed. It was investigated for the treatment of benign prostatic hyperplasia (BPH) but failed to demonstrate sufficient efficacy in phase II clinical trials, and also showed an unacceptable incidence rate and severity of side effects (e.g., breast pain and gynecomastia). As such, it was not further developed.

Zanoterone was derived from 5α-dihydroethisterone (5α-dihydro-17α-ethynyltestosterone). It is an antagonist of the androgen receptor (K_{i} = 2.2 μM; RBA compared to metribolone = 2.2%), and with the exception of antiprogestogenic activity in rat and rabbit models, is devoid of other hormonal activities. Zanoterone does not inhibit 5α-reductase, aromatase, or 3α- or 3β-hydroxysteroid dehydrogenase in vitro. The drug significantly increases testosterone and estradiol levels in men. Zanoterone has been found to not significantly inhibit mating performance or fertility in adult male rats at high dosages for an extended period of time. It has been found to act as an inducer of the enzyme CYP3A4 in vivo in rats.

Relative potencies of selected antiandrogens
Antiandrogen	Relative potency
Bicalutamide	4.3
Hydroxyflutamide	3.5
Flutamide	3.3
Cyproterone acetate	1.0
Zanoterone	0.4
Description: Relative potencies of orally administered antiandrogens in antagonizing 0.8 to 1.0 mg/kg s.c. testosterone propionate-induced ventral prostate weight increase in castrated immature male rats. Higher values mean greater potency. Sources: See template.

== Chemistry ==
=== Synthesis ===
The chemical synthesis of zanoterone has been described.

The Ethynylation of the keto group in Epiandrosterone [481-29-8] (1). with lithium acetylide and oxidation of the 3 hydroxy group with chromium trioxide gives 17-Ethinyl-dihydrotestosterone [13611-97-7] (2). Hydroxymethylation occurs at the C2 position upon reaction with methyl formate [107-31-3] in the presence of sodium methoxide to give PC173399331 (3). The enol alcohol is then converted to its benzoate protecting group, PC53632489 (4) and reaction give Mesylhydrazide [10393-86-9] gives the pyrazole ring (5).

The benzoate group was required since reacting 3 directly with the hydrazine affords mixtures of the 2 possible regioisomers.

== See also ==
- List of steroidal antiandrogens
