= Androgen-dependent condition =

- Specialty: Endocrinology

An androgen-dependent condition, disease, disorder, or syndrome, is a medical condition that is, in part or full, dependent on, or is sensitive to, the presence of androgenic activity in the body.

Known androgen-dependent conditions include acne, seborrhea, androgenic alopecia, hirsutism, hidradenitis suppurativa, precocious puberty in boys, hypersexuality, paraphilias, benign prostatic hyperplasia (BPH), prostate cancer, and hyperandrogenism in women such as in polyendocrine metabolic ovarian syndrome (PMOS, formerly known as PCOS), congenital adrenal hyperplasia (CAH), and androgen-secreting tumors (gonadal or adrenal tumor).

Such conditions may be treated with drugs with antiandrogen actions, including androgen receptor antagonists such as cyproterone acetate, spironolactone, and bicalutamide, 5α-reductase inhibitors such as finasteride and dutasteride, CYP17A1 inhibitors such as abiraterone acetate, gonadotropin-releasing hormone (GnRH) analogues such as leuprorelin and cetrorelix, and/or other antigonadotropins such as megestrol acetate and medroxyprogesterone acetate.

== See also ==
- Androgen deprivation therapy
- Androgen insensitivity syndrome
- Estrogen-dependent condition
- Spinal bulbar muscular atrophy
