= Topilutamide =

Chemical compound

Clinical data
- Trade names: Eucapil
- Other names: Fluridil; BP-766
- Routes of administration: Topical
- Drug class: Nonsteroidal antiandrogen
- ATC code: None

Identifiers
- IUPAC name: 2-hydroxy-2-methyl-N-[4-nitro-3-(trifluoromethyl)phenyl]-3-[(2,2,2-trifluoroacetyl)amino]propanamide
- CAS Number: 260980-89-0
- PubChem CID: 44147451
- ChemSpider: 8106619
- UNII: A8EU2FXY13
- ECHA InfoCard: 100.245.367

Chemical and physical data
- Formula: C_{13}H_{11}F_{6}N_{3}O_{5}
- Molar mass: 403.237 g·mol^{−1}
- 3D model (JSmol): Interactive image
- SMILES: C[C@@](CNC(=O)C(F)(F)F)(C(=O)NC1=CC(=C(C=C1)[N+](=O)[O-])C(F)(F)F)O
- InChI: InChI=1S/C13H11F6N3O5/c1-11(25,5-20-10(24)13(17,18)19)9(23)21-6-2-3-8(22(26)27)7(4-6)12(14,15)16/h2-4,25H,5H2,1H3,(H,20,24)(H,21,23)/t11-/m1/s1; Key:YCNCRLKXSLARFT-LLVKDONJSA-N

Topilutamide, known more commonly as fluridil and sold under the brand name Eucapil, is an antiandrogen medication which is used in the treatment of pattern hair loss in men and women. It is used as a topical medication and is applied to the scalp. Topilutamide belongs to a class of molecules known as perfluoroacylamido-arylpropanamides.

Topilutamide is a nonsteroidal antiandrogen (NSAA), or an antagonist of the androgen receptor (AR), the biological target of androgens like testosterone and dihydrotestosterone (DHT).

Topilutamide was introduced for medical use in 2003. It is marketed only in the Czech Republic and Slovakia. The patent for Topilutamide expired in 2020.

== Medical uses ==
Topilutamide is used as a topical medication in the treatment of pattern hair loss in men and women. Topilutamide is approved for cosmetic use in Europe but has not received FDA approval nor approval by the EMA for the treatment of androgenetic alopecia. Finasteride and Minoxidil are currently the only treatments approved for the treatment of this condition.

=== Available forms ===
Under the brand name Eucapil, topilutamide is available as a 2% topical formulation intended for application to the scalp.

== Pharmacology ==
=== Pharmacodynamics ===
Topilutamide is an antagonist of the AR, the biological target of androgens like testosterone and DHT. Fluridil binds to the androgen receptor with approximately a 9-15-fold higher affinity than more primitive NSAAs such as bicalutamide and hydroxyflutamide, but more research is required to validate these findings.

Percentage androgen receptor suppression in LNCaP Cells after 48-h Drug Incubation via Western Blot
| Compound | 3 μM | 10 μM |
|---|---|---|
| BP-766 (Topilutamide) | 41 ± 5 | 95.9 ± 6 |
| BP-521 | 62 ± 7 | 100 |
| BP-34 | 3 ± 4 | 2 ± 2 |
| Bicalutamide | 3 ± 3 | 11 ± 3 |
| Hydroxyflutamide | 2 ± 6 | 6 ± 7 |

=== Pharmacokinetics ===
Topilutamide is a topical medication and is applied to the scalp. Topilutamide degrades in human serum at 37 °C with a half-life of approximately 6 hours and is undetectable after 48 hours. Perfluoroacylamido-arylpropanamides decompose hydrolytically to BP-34 and their corresponding perfluorocarboxylic acid. In the case of topilutamide, that perfluorocarboxylic acid is trifluoroacetic acid. The two metabolites of topilutamide namely BP-34 and trifluoroacetic acid were undetectable in human serum (below the detection limit of 5 ng/mL) along with the parent compound topilutamide, in human studies. BP-34 was shown to be devoid of anti-androgenic activity.

== Chemistry ==
Topilutamide is a nonsteroidal compound and is closely related to other NSAAs such as flutamide and bicalutamide.

== History ==
Topilutamide was introduced for medical use in 2003.

== Society and culture ==
=== Generic names ===
Topilutamide is the generic name of the drug and its INN. It is also known more commonly as fluridil. Topilutamide is also known by its former developmental code name BP-766.

=== Brand names ===
Topilutamide is marketed by Interpharma Praha under the brand name Eucapil.

=== Availability ===
Topilutamide is available only in Europe in the Czech Republic and Slovakia.

== See also ==
- Clascoterone
- Pyrilutamide
- RU-58841
- Finasteride
- Dutasteride
- Minoxidil
