= Oxendolone =

Chemical compound

Clinical data
- Trade names: Prostetin, Roxenone
- Other names: TSAA-291; 16β-Ethyl-19-nortestosterone; 16β-Ethylestr-4-en-17β-ol-3-one
- Routes of administration: Intramuscular injection
- Drug class: Steroidal antiandrogen; Progestogen; Progestin

Pharmacokinetic data
- Bioavailability: Oral: Very low (1% in dogs)
- Elimination half-life: IM: 5.0–6.6 days.

Identifiers
- IUPAC name: (9S,14S,17S)-16-ethyl-17-hydroxy-13-methyl-2,6,7,8,9,10,11,12,14,15,16,17-dodecahydro-1H-cyclopenta[a]phenanthren-3-one
- CAS Number: 33765-68-3
- PubChem CID: 36592
- ChemSpider: 392001
- UNII: MN4I850D4P
- CompTox Dashboard (EPA): DTXSID8048814

Chemical and physical data
- Formula: C_{20}H_{30}O_{2}
- Molar mass: 302.458 g·mol^{−1}
- 3D model (JSmol): Interactive image
- SMILES: CCC1CC2C3CCC4=CC(=O)CCC4C3CCC2(C1O)C
- InChI: InChI=1S/C20H30O2/c1-3-12-11-18-17-6-4-13-10-14(21)5-7-15(13)16(17)8-9-20(18,2)19(12)22/h10,12,15-19,22H,3-9,11H2,1-2H3/t12?,15?,16-,17?,18+,19+,20?/m1/s1; Key:FCKLFGKATYPJPG-LNRSQMQGSA-N

Oxendolone, sold under the brand names Prostetin and Roxenone, is an antiandrogen and progestin medication which is used in Japan in the treatment of enlarged prostate. However, this use is controversial due to concerns about its clinical efficacy. Oxendolone is not effective by mouth and must be given by injection into muscle.

Oxendolone is an antiandrogen, and hence is an antagonist of the androgen receptor, the biological target of androgens like testosterone and dihydrotestosterone. It is also a progestin, or a synthetic progestogen, and hence is an agonist of the progesterone receptor, the biological target of progestogens like progesterone. Due to its progestogenic activity, oxendolone has antigonadotropic effects. Oxendolone has no other important hormonal activity...

Oxendolone was introduced for medical use in 1981. It is used only in Japan.

== Medical uses ==
Oxendolone is used in the treatment of benign prostatic hyperplasia (BPH) in Japan. It has been used at a dosage of 200 mg once every 2 weeks via intramuscular injection. Although it is approved for the treatment of BPH in Japan, concerns have been raised about its use for this condition due to poor efficacy seen in clinical trials.

== Pharmacology ==
=== Pharmacodynamics ===
Oxendolone binds to the androgen receptor (K_{i} = 320 nM) and progesterone receptor (K_{i} = 20 nM) and acts as a weak but clinically relevant inhibitor of 5α-reductase (IC_{50} = 1.4 μM). The relative binding affinity of oxendolone for the androgen receptor is 0.8 to 3.6% of that of metribolone. Oxendolone is not a silent antagonist of the androgen receptor but is rather predominantly antagonistic with weak agonistic activity; for this reason, it has been described as a selective androgen receptor modulator. The medication has potent antigonadotropic effects via its progestogenic activity. It has been found to suppress luteinizing hormone and testosterone levels to an equivalent extent as allylestrenol and chlormadinone acetate, which are two progestins that are similarly used at high doses to treat BPH.

=== Pharmacokinetics ===
The oral bioavailability of oxendolone in dogs is extremely low, 1% at most. Due to its low oral bioavailability, oxendolone is administered by intramuscular injection in humans. Its elimination half-life via this route is 5.0 to 6.6 days.

== Chemistry ==
Oxendolone, also known as 16β-ethyl-19-nortestosterone or 16β-ethylestr-4-en-17β-ol-3-one, is a synthetic estrane steroid and a derivative of testosterone and 19-nortestosterone (nandrolone).

The acetate ester of oxendolone is known as TSAA-328, while the caproate ester of oxendolone is known as TSAA-330. They were never marketed.

== History ==
Oxendolone has been marketed in Japan by Takeda since 1981.

== Society and culture ==
=== Generic names ===
Oxendolone is the generic name of the drug and its INN, USAN, and JAN. It is also known by its developmental code name TSAA-291.

=== Brand names ===
Oxendolone is or has been sold under the brand names Prostetin and Roxenone.

=== Availability ===
Oxendolone is marketed only in Japan.
