= Metogest =

Chemical compound

Clinical data
- ATC code: None

Identifiers
- IUPAC name: 17β-Hydroxy-16,16-dimethylestr-4-en-3-one
- CAS Number: 52279-58-0
- PubChem CID: 9839398
- ChemSpider: 8015116
- UNII: BPY4IK3W14
- CompTox Dashboard (EPA): DTXSID00200306

Chemical and physical data
- Formula: C_{20}H_{30}O_{2}
- Molar mass: 302.458 g·mol^{−1}
- 3D model (JSmol): Interactive image
- SMILES: C[C@]12CC[C@H]3[C@H]([C@@H]1CC([C@@H]2O)(C)C)CCC4=CC(=O)CC[C@H]34
- InChI: InChI=1S/C20H30O2/c1-19(2)11-17-16-6-4-12-10-13(21)5-7-14(12)15(16)8-9-20(17,3)18(19)22/h10,14-18,22H,4-9,11H2,1-3H3/t14-,15+,16+,17-,18-,20-/m0/s1; Key:JYCITEUSLNKPHC-URNBORRASA-N

Metogest (INN, USAN) (developmental code name SC-14207), also known as 16,16-dimethyl-19-nortestosterone, is a steroidal antiandrogen that was patented in 1975 and investigated as a treatment for acne but was never marketed.

== See also ==
- Steroidal antiandrogen
- List of steroidal antiandrogens
