= Nonsteroidal antiandrogen =

Antiandrogen with a nonsteroidal chemical structure

- Drug class
- Bicalutamide, the most widely used nonsteroidal antiandrogen and the most widely used antiandrogen in prostate cancer.

Class identifiers
- Synonyms: Nonsteroidal androgen receptor antagonists
- Use: Prostate cancer; Acne; Hirsutism; Seborrhea; Pattern hair loss; Hyperandrogenism; Transgender hormone therapy; Male precocious puberty; Priapism
- ATC code: L02BB
- Biological target: Androgen receptor
- Chemical class: Nonsteroidal

Legal status

A nonsteroidal antiandrogen (NSAA) is an antiandrogen with a nonsteroidal chemical structure. They are typically selective and full or silent antagonists of the androgen receptor (AR) and act by directly blocking the effects of androgens like testosterone and dihydrotestosterone (DHT). NSAAs are used in the treatment of androgen-dependent conditions in men and women. They are the converse of steroidal antiandrogens (SAAs), which are antiandrogens that are steroids and are structurally related to testosterone.

== Medical uses ==
NSAAs are used in clinical medicine for the following indications:

- Prostate cancer in men
- Androgen-dependent skin and hair conditions like acne, hirsutism, seborrhea, and pattern hair loss (androgenic alopecia) in women
- Hyperandrogenism, such as due to polyendocrine metabolic ovarian syndrome (PMOS) or congenital adrenal hyperplasia, in women
- As a component of hormone therapy for transgender women
- Precocious puberty in boys
- Priapism in men

=== Available forms ===
Antiandrogens marketed for clinical or veterinary use
Generic name	Class	Type	Brand name(s)	Route(s)	Launch	Status
Aminoglutethimide	Nonsteroidal	Androgen synthesis inhibitor	Cytadren, Orimeten	Oral	1960	Available^{b}
Apalutamide	Nonsteroidal	AR antagonist	Erleada	Oral	2018	Available
Bicalutamide	Nonsteroidal	AR antagonist	Casodex	Oral	1995	Available
Enzalutamide	Nonsteroidal	AR antagonist	Xtandi	Oral	2012	Available
Flutamide	Nonsteroidal	AR antagonist	Eulexin	Oral	1983	Available
Ketoconazole	Nonsteroidal	Androgen synthesis inhibitor and weak AR antagonist	Nizoral, others	Oral, topical	1981	Available
Nilutamide	Nonsteroidal	AR antagonist	Anandron, Nilandron	Oral	1987	Available
Topilutamide	Nonsteroidal	AR antagonist	Eucapil	Topical	2003	Available^{b}
Footnotes: ^{a} = Hits = Google Search hits (as of February 2018). ^{b} = Availability limited / mostly discontinued. Class: Steroidal = Steroidal antiandrogen. Nonsteroidal = Nonsteroidal antiandrogen. Sources: See individual articles.

== Pharmacology ==
Unlike SAAs, NSAAs have little or no capacity to activate the AR, show no off-target hormonal activity such as progestogenic, glucocorticoid, or antimineralocorticoid activity, and lack antigonadotropic effects. For these reasons, they have improved efficacy and selectivity as antiandrogens and do not lower androgen levels, instead acting solely by directly blocking the actions of androgens at the level of their biological target, the AR.

== List of NSAAs ==
=== Marketed ===
==== First-generation ====
- Flutamide (Eulexin): Marketed for the treatment of prostate cancer and also used in the treatment of acne, hirsutism, and hyperandrogenism in women. It has also been studied in the treatment of benign prostatic hyperplasia. Now little-used due to high incidence of elevated liver enzymes and hepatotoxicity and the availability of safer agents.
- Nilutamide (Anandron, Nilandron): Marketed for the treatment of prostate cancer. Very little-used due to a high incidence of interstitial pneumonitis and high rates of several unique and unfavorable side effects such as nausea and vomiting, visual disturbances, and alcohol intolerance.
- Bicalutamide (Casodex): Marketed for the treatment of prostate cancer and also used in the treatment of hirsutism in women, as a component of hormone therapy for transgender women, to delay precocious puberty in boys, to prevent or alleviate priapism, and for other indications. It has also been studied in the treatment of benign prostatic hyperplasia. By far the most widely used NSAA, due to its favorable profile of efficacy, tolerability, and safety.
- Topilutamide (Eucapil): Also known as fluridil. Marketed as a topical medication for the treatment of pattern hair loss (androgenic alopecia) in the Czech Republic and Slovakia. Limited availability and lack of an oral formulation for systemic use make it a very little-known drug.

==== Second-generation ====
- Apalutamide (Erleada): Marketed for the treatment of prostate cancer. Very similar to enzalutamide, but with reduced central nervous system distribution and hence is expected to have a reduced risk of seizures and other central side effects.
- Enzalutamide (Xtandi): Marketed for the treatment of prostate cancer. More effective than the first-generation NSAAs due to increased efficacy and potency and shows no risk of elevated liver enzymes or hepatotoxicity. However, it has a small (1%) risk of seizures and has central nervous system side effects like anxiety and insomnia due to off-target inhibition of the GABA_{A} receptor that the first-generation NSAAs do not have. In addition, it has prominent drug interactions due to moderate to strong induction of multiple cytochrome P450 enzymes. Currently on-patent with no generic availability and hence is very expensive.
- Darolutamide (Nubeqa): Marketed for the treatment of prostate cancer. Structurally distinct from enzalutamide, apalutamide, and other NSAAs. Relative to enzalutamide and apalutamide, shows greater efficacy as an AR antagonist, improved activity against mutated AR variants in prostate cancer, little or no inhibition or induction of cytochrome P450 enzymes, and little or no central nervous system distribution. However, has a much shorter terminal half-life and lower potency.

==== Miscellaneous ====
- Cimetidine (Tagamet): An over-the-counter histamine H_{2} receptor antagonist that also shows very weak activity as an AR antagonist. Also inhibits cytochrome P450 enzymes and thereby inhibits hepatic estradiol metabolism and increases circulating estradiol levels. It has been investigated in the treatment of hirsutism but showed minimal effectiveness. Sometimes causes gynecomastia as a rare side effect.

Nonsteroidal androgen synthesis inhibitors like ketoconazole can also be described as "NSAAs", although the term is usually reserved to describe AR antagonists.

=== Not marketed ===
==== Under development ====
- Proxalutamide (GT-0918): A second-generation NSAA. It is under development for the treatment of prostate cancer. Similar to enzalutamide and apalutamide, but with increased efficacy as an AR antagonist, little or no central nervous system distribution, and no induction of seizures in animals.
- Seviteronel (VT-464) is a nonsteroidal androgen biosynthesis inhibitor which is under development for the treatment of prostate cancer.

==== Development discontinued ====
- Cioteronel (CPC-10997; Cyoctol, Ethocyn, X-Andron): A structurally unique first-generation NSAA. It was under development as an oral medication for the treatment of benign prostatic hyperplasia and as a topical medication for the treatment of acne and pattern hair loss. It reached phase II and phase III clinical trials for these indications prior to discontinuation due to insufficient effectiveness.
- Inocoterone acetate (RU-38882, RU-882): A steroid-like NSAA. It was under development as a topical medication for the treatment of acne but was discontinued due to insufficient effectiveness in clinical trials.
- RU-58841 (PSK-3841, HMR-3841): A first-generation NSAA related to nilutamide. It was under development as a topical medication for the treatment of acne and pattern hair loss but its development was discontinued during phase I clinical trials.

== See also ==
- Selective androgen receptor modulator
- N-Terminal domain antiandrogen
- Discovery and development of antiandrogens
- Nonsteroidal estrogen
