= Topterone =

Chemical compound

Clinical data
- Other names: WIN-17665; Propyltestosterone; 17α-Propyltestosterone; 17α-Propylandrost-4-en-17β-ol-3-one
- Routes of administration: Topical

Identifiers
- IUPAC name: (8R,9S,10R,13S,14S,17S)-17-hydroxy-10,13-dimethyl-17-propyl-2,6,7,8,9,11,12,14,15,16-decahydro-1H-cyclopenta[a]phenanthren-3-one
- CAS Number: 60607-35-4
- PubChem CID: 9797605
- ChemSpider: 39526
- UNII: 77WPB17ZK1
- CompTox Dashboard (EPA): DTXSID20209417
- ECHA InfoCard: 100.056.638

Chemical and physical data
- Formula: C_{22}H_{34}O_{2}
- Molar mass: 330.512 g·mol^{−1}
- 3D model (JSmol): Interactive image
- SMILES: CCCC1(CCC2C1(CCC3C2CCC4=CC(=O)CCC34C)C)O
- InChI: InChI=1S/C22H34O2/c1-4-10-22(24)13-9-19-17-6-5-15-14-16(23)7-11-20(15,2)18(17)8-12-21(19,22)3/h14,17-19,24H,4-13H2,1-3H3/t17-,18+,19+,20+,21+,22+/m1/s1; Key:LZSOOHLAZHOTHJ-GUCLMQHLSA-N

Topterone (INN, USAN) (developmental code name WIN-17665), also known as 17α-propyltestosterone (or simply propyltestosterone) or as 17α-propylandrost-4-en-17β-ol-3-one, is a steroidal antiandrogen that was first reported in 1978 and was developed for topical administration but, due to poor effectiveness, was never marketed.

== See also ==
- Steroidal antiandrogen
- List of steroidal antiandrogens
