= Progonadotropin =

Drug class

- Drug class
- Clomifene, a SERM with progonadotropic effects which is used in the treatment of infertility to induce ovulation.

Class identifiers
- Synonyms: Hypergonadotropin; Gonad stimulant
- Use: Hypogonadism, infertility
- Chemical class: Steroidal; Nonsteroidal

Legal status

A progonadotropin, or hypergonadotropin, also known as a gonad stimulant, is a type of drug which increases the secretion of one or both of the major gonadotropins, luteinizing hormone (LH) and follicle-stimulating hormone (FSH). This, in turn, results in increased function and maintenance of the gonads and increased gonadal steroidogenesis of sex hormones such as androgens, estrogens, and progestogens. Progonadotropins are the functional opposites of antigonadotropins. They have clinical applications in the treatment of hypogonadism and infertility. Conversely, hypergonadotropic effects can occur as a side effect of some drugs. Examples of progonadotropic drugs include gonadotropin-releasing hormone (GnRH) agonists when administered in a pulsatile (as opposed to continuous) manner, antiestrogens such as tamoxifen, clomifene, fulvestrant, and aromatase inhibitors like anastrozole, and, only in men, pure antiandrogens such as flutamide, bicalutamide, enzalutamide, and apalutamide.
