= Rosterolone =

Chemical compound

Clinical data
- Other names: SH-434; 17α-Propylmesterolone; 17β-Hydroxy-1α-methyl-17α-propyl-5α-androstan-3-one
- Routes of administration: Topical

Identifiers
- IUPAC name: (1S,5S,8R,9S,10S,13S,14S,17S)-17-hydroxy-1,10,13-trimethyl-17-propyl-2,4,5,6,7,8,9,11,12,14,15,16-dodecahydro-1H-cyclopenta[a]phenanthren-3-one
- CAS Number: 79243-67-7
- PubChem CID: 71232
- ChemSpider: 64367
- UNII: 3L5C5C8ZNG
- ChEMBL: ChEMBL2107498
- CompTox Dashboard (EPA): DTXSID801033022
- ECHA InfoCard: 100.071.904

Chemical and physical data
- Formula: C_{23}H_{38}O_{2}
- Molar mass: 346.555 g·mol^{−1}
- 3D model (JSmol): Interactive image
- SMILES: CCCC1(CCC2C1(CCC3C2CCC4C3(C(CC(=O)C4)C)C)C)O
- InChI: InChI=1S/C23H38O2/c1-5-10-23(25)12-9-19-18-7-6-16-14-17(24)13-15(2)22(16,4)20(18)8-11-21(19,23)3/h15-16,18-20,25H,5-14H2,1-4H3/t15-,16-,18-,19-,20-,21-,22-,23-/m0/s1; Key:IMFNBOMNWHWKQD-MXENSADDSA-N

Rosterolone (INN) (developmental code name SH-434), also known as 17α-propylmesterolone or 1α-methyl-17α-propyl-5α-androstan-17β-ol-3-one, is a steroidal antiandrogen which was first described in 1984 and was developed for topical administration but was never marketed. It has shown some efficacy in the treatment of acne, and lacks systemic effects with either topical or systemic administration. Rosterolone is a derivative of mesterolone, which, in contrast, is an androgen and anabolic steroid.

== See also ==
- Steroidal antiandrogen -chemical
- List of steroidal antiandrogens
