= Antigonadotropin =

Drug

- Drug class

Class identifiers
- Use: For the treatment of androgen and estrogen-related medical conditions.
- ATC code: G03XA
- Biological target: GnRH receptor, gonadotropin receptors (FSHR, LHR), sex steroid receptors (AR, ER, PR)

Legal status

An antigonadotropin is a drug which suppresses the activity and/or downstream effects of one or both of the gonadotropins, follicle-stimulating hormone (FSH) and luteinizing hormone (LH). This results in an inhibition of the hypothalamic-pituitary-gonadal (HPG) axis, and thus a decrease in the levels of the androgen, estrogen, and progestogen sex steroids in the body. Antigonadotropins also inhibit ovulation in women and spermatogenesis in men. They are used for a variety of purposes, including for the hormonal birth control, treatment of hormonally-sensitive cancers, to delay precocious puberty and puberty in transgender youth, as a form of chemical castration to reduce the sex drives of individuals with hypersexuality or pedophilia, and to treat estrogen-associated conditions in women such as menorrhagia and endometriosis, among others. High-dose antigonadotropin therapy has been referred to as medical castration.

The best-known and widely used antigonadotropins are the gonadotropin-releasing hormone (GnRH) analogues (both agonists and antagonists). However, many other drugs have antigonadotropic properties as well, including compounds acting on sex steroid hormone receptors such as progestogens, androgens, and estrogens (due to negative feedback on the HPG axis), as well as steroid synthesis inhibitors such as danazol and gestrinone. Since progestins have relatively little effect on sexual differentiation compared to the other sex steroids, potent ones such as cyproterone acetate, medroxyprogesterone acetate, and chlormadinone acetate are often used at high doses specifically for their antigonadotropic effects.

Danazol, gestrinone, and paroxypropione have all been classified specifically as antigonadotropins.

Prolactin has antigonadotropic effects and hyperprolactinemia can cause hypogonadism.

Opioids have antigonadotropic effects and can reduce luteinizing hormone and testosterone levels in men. A 2015 systematic review and meta-analysis found that opioid therapy decreased testosterone levels in men by about 165 ng/dL (5.7 nmol/L) on average, which was a reduction in testosterone level of almost 50%. In contrast to opioids, opioid antagonists, like naltrexone, have progonadotropic effects, and can increase luteinizing hormone and testosterone levels.

== See also ==
- Progonadotropin
- CYP17A1 inhibitor
- Steroidogenesis inhibitor
- Antiandrogen
- Antiestrogen
- Antiprogestogen
- Neurosteroidogenesis inhibitor
