= Pharmacology of cyproterone acetate =

Clinical data
- Routes of administration: By mouth, intramuscular injection
- Drug class: Steroidal antiandrogen; Progestin; Progestogen; Progestogen ester; Antigonadotropin

Pharmacokinetic data
- Bioavailability: Oral: 68–100%
- Protein binding: Albumin: 93% Free: 7%
- Metabolism: Hepatic (CYP3A4)
- Metabolites: • 15β-OH-CPA (major) • Cyproterone (minor) • Acetic acid (minor)
- Elimination half-life: Oral: 1.6–4.3 days IM: 3–4.3 days
- Excretion: Feces: 70% Urine: 30%

The pharmacology of cyproterone acetate (CPA) concerns the pharmacology (pharmacodynamics, pharmacokinetics, and routes of administration) of the steroidal antiandrogen and progestin medication cyproterone acetate.

CPA blocks the effects of androgens like testosterone in the body, which it does by preventing them from interacting with their biological target, the androgen receptor (AR), and by reducing their production by the gonads and hence their concentrations in the body. In addition, it has progesterone-like effects by activating the progesterone receptor (PR). By activating the PR, CPA has antigonadotropic effects and can inhibit fertility and suppress sex hormone production in both men and women. CPA can also produce weak and partial cortisol-like effects at very high doses under certain circumstances by activating the glucocorticoid receptor (GR).

CPA can be taken by mouth or by injection into muscle. It has near-complete oral bioavailability, is highly and exclusively bound to albumin in terms of plasma protein binding, is metabolized in the liver by hydroxylation and conjugation, has 15β-hydroxycyproterone acetate (15β-OH-CPA) as a single major active metabolite, has a long elimination half-life of about 2 to 4 days regardless of route of administration, and is excreted in feces primarily and to a lesser extent in urine.

== Pharmacodynamics ==
CPA has antiandrogenic activity, progestogenic activity, weak partial glucocorticoid activity, weak steroidogenesis inhibitor activity, and agonist activity at the pregnane X receptor. It has no estrogenic or antimineralocorticoid activity. In terms of potency, CPA is described as a highly potent progestogen, a moderately potent antiandrogen, and a weak glucocorticoid.

Relative affinities (%) of cyproterone acetate
Progestogen	PR	AR	ER	GR	MR
Cyproterone acetate	90	6	0	6	8
Notes: Values are percentages (%). Reference ligands (100%) were promegestone for the PR, metribolone for the AR, estradiol for the ER, dexamethasone for the GR, and aldosterone for the MR. Sources:

Parenteral potencies and durations of progestogens (Note: Sources:) (Note: All given by intramuscular or subcutaneous injection.)
Compound	Form	Dose for specific uses (mg) (Note: Progesterone production during the luteal phase is ~25 (15–50) mg/day. The OID of OHPC is 250 to 500 mg/month.)			DOA (Note: Duration of action in days.)
Compound	Form	TFD (Note: Usually given for 14 days.)	POICD (Note: Usually dosed every two to three months.)	CICD (Note: Usually dosed once monthly.)	DOA
Algestone acetophenide	Oil soln.	–	–	75–150	14–32 d
Gestonorone caproate	Oil soln.	25–50	–	–	8–13 d
Hydroxyprogest. acetate (Note: Never marketed or approved by this route.)	Aq. susp.	350	–	–	9–16 d
Hydroxyprogest. caproate	Oil soln.	250–500 (Note: In divided doses (2 × 125 or 250 mg for OHPC, 10 × 20 mg for P4).)	–	250–500	5–21 d
Medroxyprog. acetate	Aq. susp.	50–100	150	25	14–50+ d
Megestrol acetate	Aq. susp.	–	–	25	>14 d
Norethisterone enanthate	Oil soln.	100–200	200	50	11–52 d
Progesterone	Oil soln.	200	–	–	2–6 d
Progesterone	Aq. soln.	?	–	–	1–2 d
Progesterone	Aq. susp.	50–200	–	–	7–14 d
Notes and sources:

=== Antiandrogenic activity ===
Affinities (Note: At androgen receptors; measured in human prostate tissue.)
Compound	RBA (Note: Relative to Metribolone, which is by definition 100%)
Metribolone	100
Dihydrotestosterone	85
Cyproterone acetate	7.8
Bicalutamide	1.4
Nilutamide	0.9
Hydroxyflutamide	0.57
Flutamide	<0.0057
Notes:

Relative potencies of selected antiandrogens
Antiandrogen	Relative potency
Bicalutamide	4.3
Hydroxyflutamide	3.5
Flutamide	3.3
Cyproterone acetate	1.0
Zanoterone	0.4
Description: Relative potencies of orally administered antiandrogens in antagonizing 0.8 to 1.0 mg/kg s.c. testosterone propionate-induced ventral prostate weight increase in castrated immature male rats. Higher values mean greater potency. Sources: See template.

CPA is a potent competitive antagonist of the androgen receptor (AR), the biological target of androgens such as testosterone and dihydrotestosterone (DHT). It was at one time the most potent known AR antagonist of the steroidal antiandrogens, out of hundreds of other compounds. CPA has the highest antiandrogenic activity of any other clinically used progestin. It directly blocks endogenous androgens like testosterone and DHT from binding to and activating the AR, and thus prevents them from exerting their androgenic effects, such as masculinization and prostate gland growth, in the body.

A comparative study of binding inhibition to the AR in rat prostate cytosol AR found IC_{50} values of 3 nM for DHT, 24 nM for cyproterone acetate, and 67 nM for spironolactone.

Affinities of selected ligands at the androgen receptor
Compound	AR RBA (%)	AR K_{i} (nM)
Metribolone	100	1.18
Dihydrotestosterone	136	0.87
Testosterone	117	1.01
Spironolactone	67.0	1.76
Trimethyltrienolone	14.8	8.0
Megestrol acetate	13.6	8.7
Cyproterone acetate	12.5	9.5
Progesterone	6.6	18
Estradiol	4.9	24
Androstenedione	2.0	58
Canrenone	0.84	140
Flutamide	0.079	1200
Cimetidine	0.00084	140,000
Notes: (1) Human skin fibroblasts used for assays. (2) Situation in vivo is different for flutamide and spironolactone due biotransformation. (3) Conflicting findings for spironolactone. Sources: Main: Related:

==== Antiandrogenic efficacy and potency ====
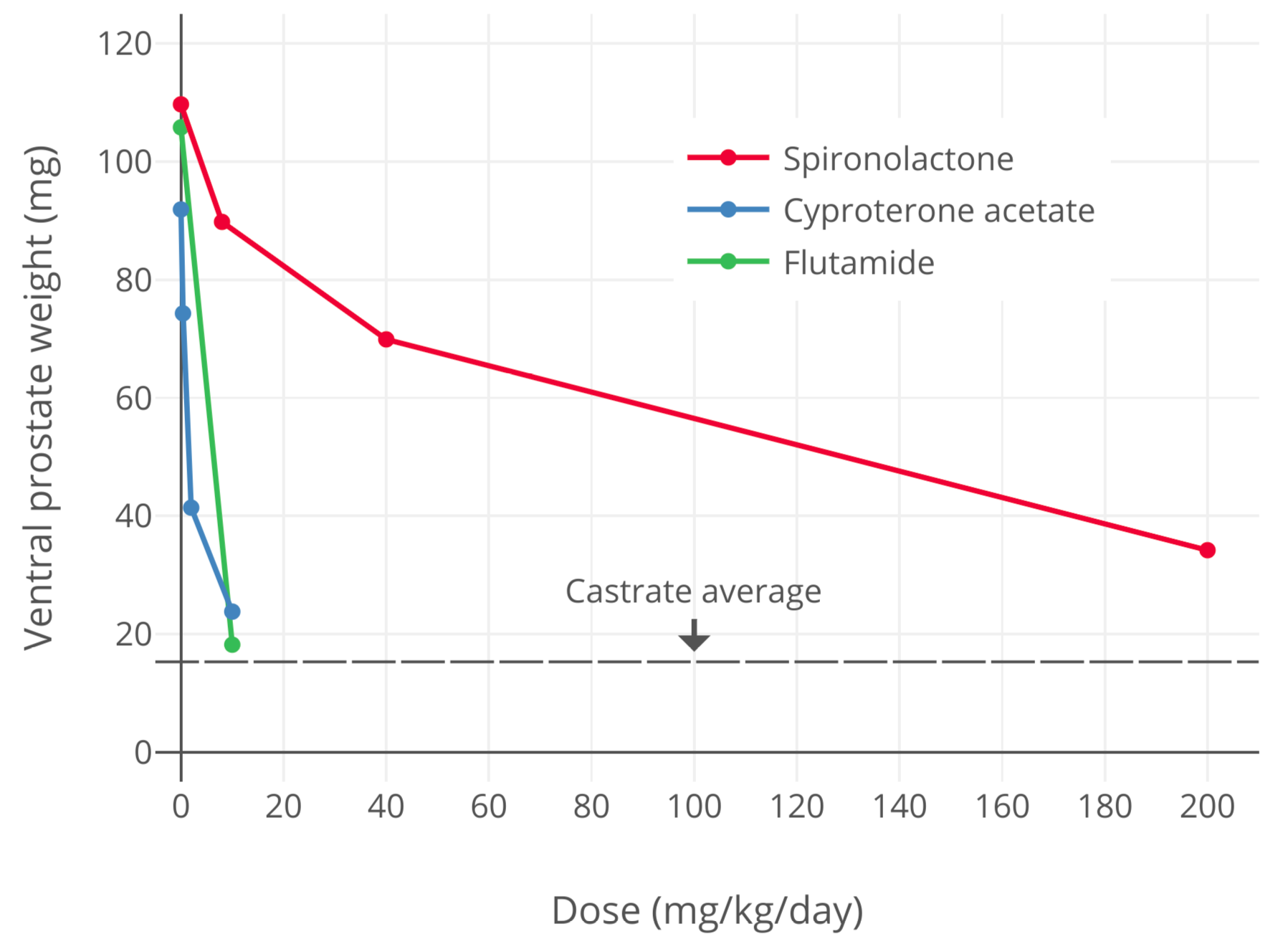
Androgen receptor antagonistic potency of spironolactone, CPA, and flutamide in castrated male rats treated with exogenous testosterone (as measured by inhibition of androgen-dependent ventral prostate weight).

The antiandrogenic activity of CPA is dose-dependent. Although CPA is a potent antiandrogen, relatively high doses of CPA are nonetheless required for clinically important AR antagonism. The clinical antiandrogenic efficacy of birth control pills containing CPA, which have only low doses of CPA in them (2 mg/day), often can't be distinguished from that of birth control pills containing other progestins. It is likely that the antiandrogenic effects of CPA-containing birth control pills are due mostly to the ethinylestradiol component and/or suppression of androgen levels, rather than the antiandrogenic activity of the small doses of CPA present in them.

CPA has been found to decrease inflammatory acne lesions in males by about 15% at 5 mg/day, by 45% at 25 mg/day, and by 73% at 100 mg/day. A dosage of 100 mg/day CPA can achieve a 65 to 70% reduction in sebum excretion rate in males within 4 weeks of treatment, but doses of 10 mg/day CPA or less are said to have a negligible effect. On the basis of these findings, it has estimated that the threshold dosage of CPA to reduce sebum production may be 5 mg/day in males. In other studies, 25 mg/day CPA resulted in substantial improvement or complete clearance of severe acne in almost all males, whereas 12.5 mg/day was ineffective.

CPA has been found to be strongly catabolic in young healthy males. It was shown to result in a mean negative nitrogen balance of 1.2 g at 50 mg/day, 1.4 g at 100 mg/day, and 2.5 g at 200 mg/day. This corresponded to mean losses of lean tissue of 780, 945, and 1,515 g, respectively. Conversely, the catabolic effect was much less in an older male, and no such effect was observed in adult females consuming a diet with sufficient calories and protein. The catabolic effects of CPA were found to be greater than those of corticosteroids.

Although higher doses of CPA are necessary for considerable systemic AR antagonistic activity, it is notable that even low doses of oral CPA appear to be able to significantly antagonize AR signaling in the liver in women. This may be related to the hepatic first-pass effect of oral administration, and is evidenced by the fact that whereas combined birth control pills containing CPA increase SHBG levels by 300 to 400%, combined birth control pills containing various other progestins, with either androgenic or antiandrogenic activity, increase SHBG levels by only 50 to 300%. This is relevant as estrogens stimulate hepatic SHBG production while androgens inhibit hepatic SHBG production, and vice versa for their antagonists. The antiandrogenic activity of CPA may also be responsible for the relatively greater risk of venous thromboembolism with CPA-containing birth control pills compared to those containing other progestins.

In rats, a dosage of CPA of 25 mg/kg/day results in complete regression of prostate gland growth in gonadally intact males. The equivalent dosage in humans, on the basis of body surface (conversion factor from rat to human of 6), was estimated to be approximately 4 mg/kg/day, or around 300 mg/day CPA for a 75 kg (165 lb) man. Other techniques for determining the dosage of CPA have validated this extrapolation, for instance affinity studies and prostatic CPA levels. The affinity of CPA for the AR is around 20-fold lower than that of DHT, and an excess of CPA levels of around 20 to 30 times those of DHT would hence be expected to maximally neutralize androgen signaling. In accordance, different publications have stated based on preclinical experiments that a 2- to 5-fold excess of CPA can inhibit the effects of testosterone by 50%, a 3- to 10-fold excess of CPA can reduce the effects of "potent androgens" (presumably testosterone and/or DHT) by 50%, and a 10-fold excess of CPA can inhibit the effects of testosterone by "almost 100%". High-dose CPA has been found to achieve prostatic levels that are at least 30-fold those of DHT. One study found that levels of CPA in the prostate gland in men being treated with 200 mg/day oral CPA were about 28 times those of DHT. In accordance with the preceding findings, it has been stated that oral doses of CPA of at least 300 mg/day may achieve a combined androgen blockade action in the treatment of prostate cancer. At a dosage of CPA of 100 mg/day in men with prostate cancer, circulating levels of CPA (e.g., 350 ng/mL) are on the order of 200-fold higher than circulating levels of testosterone (e.g., 100 ng/dL). In men who have undergone orchiectomy, 50 mg/day oral CPA results in a 500-fold excess of circulating CPA relative to circulating testosterone.

In accordance with such findings, high-dose CPA shows equivalent effects on the prostate gland in men relative to high-dose diethylstilbestrol or buserelin, which both achieve castrate levels of testosterone. However, a lower dosage of 50 mg/day CPA has been found to produce a reduction in prostate volume in men with benign prostatic hyperplasia that is reportedly comparable to that observed with surgical or medical castration. In accordance, the dosage of CPA that achieves complete inhibition of the secretory function of the healthy prostate gland is around 50 to 100 mg/day, which is less than the dosage of 200 to 300 mg/day CPA that is used to treat prostate cancer. It has been said that in combined androgen blockade regimens with castration and CPA as the AR antagonist for prostate cancer, due to the marked reduction in androgen levels, lower dosages of CPA than those used as a monotherapy would seem to be equally effective. Relative to the 200 to 300 mg/day dosage of CPA used as a monotherapy in prostate cancer, the recommended dosage in combined androgen blockade is 100 to 200 mg/day. It has been stated that this dosage should be more than necessary to inhibit the effects of the remaining adrenal androgens in castrated men.

Despite considerable suppression of testosterone levels, only a modest suppression of spermatogenesis typically occurs with 5 to 10 mg/day CPA, and azoospermia occurs only occasionally. Conversely, a combination of testosterone enanthate injections with 12.5 to 100 mg/day CPA results in azoospermia in most men. The rates of azoospermia increased with greater CPA dosage, which was attributed to the additional AR antagonism of higher doses of CPA. Significant spermatogenesis still occurs with 50 mg/day CPA alone, but spermatogenesis is significantly reduced compared to normal. At a dosage of 200 mg/day, CPA has been found to produce azoospermia (sperm count of less than 1 million/mL) in men within 8 to 10 weeks of treatment. However, fertility is generally lost even at a lower dosage of CPA of 100 mg/day because there is complete inhibition of the accessory sex glands and hence an absence of semen production and ejaculate upon orgasm. Ejaculate volume decreases at a dosage of 50 mg/day and decreases to almost zero after 6 weeks of high-dose CPA therapy. The effects of CPA on fertility are completely reversible. This has been demonstrated in clinical studies of male adolescents and adults treated with CPA continuously for 6 to 7 years.

==== Weak partial androgenic activity ====
CPA, like spironolactone and other steroidal antiandrogens such as chlormadinone acetate and megestrol acetate, is actually not a pure antagonist of the AR – that is, a silent antagonist – but rather appears to be a very weak partial agonist. Clinically, CPA generally functions purely as an antiandrogen, as it displaces much more efficacious endogenous androgens such as testosterone and DHT from interacting with the receptor and thus its net effect is virtually always to lower physiological androgenic activity. But unlike silent antagonists of the AR like nonsteroidal antiandrogens such as flutamide, bicalutamide, and enzalutamide, CPA, by virtue of its slight intrinsic activity at the AR, may be unable to fully inhibit androgenic signaling in the body, which may persist to an extent in some tissues such as the prostate gland.

In accordance with its albeit weak capacity for activation of the AR, CPA has been found to stimulate androgen-sensitive carcinoma growth in the absence of other androgens, an effect which could be blocked by co-treatment with flutamide. In one study in rodents, DHT-stimulated prostate weight remained 40% above controls with administration of CPA even at the highest dosage, while flutamide was able to completely block the stimulatory effects of DHT. In addition, CPA alone increased prostate weight by 60%, whereas flutamide had no effect. As a result of its weak intrinsic androgenicity, CPA may not be as effective in the treatment of certain androgen-sensitive conditions such as prostate cancer compared to nonsteroidal antiandrogens with a silent antagonist profile at the AR. Indeed, CPA has never been found to extend life in prostate cancer patients when added to castration relative to castration alone, unlike nonsteroidal antiandrogens. As such, it is thought that the partial androgenic activity of CPA and other steroidal antiandrogens underlies the superior antiandrogenic efficacy of silent-antagonist nonsteroidal antiandrogens like flutamide. However, the clinical significance of the weak androgenic activity of CPA has also been disputed. In fact, some studies have found little or no stimulating effect of CPA on the prostate gland or seminal vesicles of male rats even with very high circulating concentrations of CPA.

Nonsteroidal antiandrogens like flutamide and bicalutamide are more efficacious as antiandrogens than CPA in castrated animals due to their superior AR antagonistic activity. Conversely, CPA is a much more potent antiandrogen than nonsteroidal antiandrogens like flutamide and bicalutamide in gonadally intact male animals, which is due to its antigonadotropic effects and consequent suppression of testosterone levels (nonsteroidal antiandrogens do not suppress testosterone levels).

CPA at high doses (e.g., 25–50 mg/day) has been reported to suppress SHBG levels, and may have a partial androgenic effect on hepatic SHBG production at such doses. Similar effects are known for related androgenic progestins like medroxyprogesterone acetate and megestrol acetate. CPA has also been reported to lower HDL cholesterol levels, another effect associated with androgens. Accordingly, CPA shows weak androgenic effects in the liver in rodents which can be blocked by flutamide.

==== Other androgenic and antiandrogenic actions ====
A paradoxical effect occurs with certain prostate cancer cells which have genetic mutations in their ARs. These altered ARs can be activated, rather than inhibited, by CPA. In such cases, withdrawal of CPA may result in a reduction in cancer growth, rather than the reverse. This is known as antiandrogen withdrawal syndrome.

CPA may also have a slight direct inhibitory effect on 5α-reductase, though the evidence for this is sparse and conflicting. Most studies however suggest that CPA does not produce important inhibition of 5α-reductase. The combination of birth control pills containing CPA with finasteride, a well-established, selective 5α-reductase inhibitor, has been found to result in significantly improved effectiveness in the treatment of hirsutism relative to CPA-containing birth control pills alone.

In addition to its AR antagonistic activity and suppression of gonadal sex-hormone production, high-dose CPA has been found to suppress the levels of the adrenal androgen dehydroepiandrosterone sulfate (DHEA-S), which is due to exertion of negative feedback by CPA on adrenocorticotropic hormone (ACTH) secretion via the glucocorticoid activity of CPA.

=== Progestogenic activity ===
CPA is a highly potent progestogen. It is described as the most potent progestin of the 17α-hydroxyprogesterone group, being about 1,200-fold more potent than hydroxyprogesterone acetate, 12-fold more potent than medroxyprogesterone acetate, and 3-fold more potent than chlormadinone acetate in animal bioassays. Based on results in the animal bioassays, CPA has also been said to be the most potent progestin known, with 1,000 times the potency of progesterone. With oral administration in humans however, CPA is distinctly less potent as a progestogen than various other progestins such as the 19-nortestosterone derivatives. The effective dosage of CPA needed to inhibit ovulation by itself in women (i.e., to act as a contraceptive) is 1 mg/day, and the medication is marketed as a contraceptive (combined with low-dose ethinylestradiol) at a dosage of 2 mg/day. For comparison, the ovulation-inhibiting dosage of levonorgestrel is 50 μg/day.

At the dosages typically used clinically, CPA is described as a "strong" and "powerful" progestogen. Its endometrial transformation dosage is 20 to 30 mg per cycle and its menstrual delay test dosage has been estimated to be less than 1 mg/day. CPA is not well-balanced in terms of its activities; relative to the progestogenic potency of CPA, its potency as an androgen receptor antagonist is quite weak. In order to take full advantage of its antiandrogenic activity, CPA must be administered at a dosage of 50 to 100 mg per day, which is 2 to 3 times the cyclical endometrial transformation dose per day. As such, the total dosage of CPA per month is as much as 30 times the physiological equivalent of progesterone production during the normal menstrual cycle, and is notably equivalent to the total production of progesterone by a corpus luteum throughout the course of a woman's entire cyclic life. Consequently, there is profound overdosage of progestogenic effect (and by extension progestogenic side effects) when CPA is used as an antiandrogen at high doses. For this reason, it has been said that CPA cannot be considered an ideal antiandrogen.

Through its action as a progestogen, CPA has been found to significantly increase prolactin secretion and to induce extensive lobuloalveolar development of the mammary glands of female rhesus macaques. In accordance, a study found that CPA, in all cases, induced full lobuloalveolar development of the breasts in transgender women treated with the medication in combination with estrogen for a prolonged period of time. Pregnancy-like breast hyperplasia was observed in two of the subjects. In contrast, the same study found that men with prostate cancer treated with a non-progestogenic antiandrogen like flutamide or bicalutamide and no estrogen produced moderate but incomplete lobuloalveolar development of the breasts. Based on the above research, it was concluded by the study authors that combined estrogenic and progestogenic action is required in transgender women for fully mature female-like histologic breast development (i.e., that includes complete lobuloalveolar maturation). Also, it was observed that lobuloalveolar maturation reverses upon discontinuation of CPA after surgical castration, similarly to the case of mammary gland involution in postpartum women, indicating that continued progestogen treatment is necessary to maintain the histology. It should be noted however that although these findings may have important implications in the context of lactation and breastfeeding, epithelial tissue accounts for approximately only 10% of breast volume with the bulk of the breasts (80–90%) being represented by stromal or adipose tissue, and it is uncertain to what extent, if any, that development of lobuloalveolar structures (a type of epithelial tissue) contributes to breast size or shape.

CPA has been found to increase prolactin levels in humans both alone and in combination with an estrogen.

==== Antigonadotropic effects ====
CPA has potent antigonadotropic effects via its progestogenic activity. It blunts the gonadotropin releasing hormone (GnRH)-induced secretion of gonadotropins, and accordingly, markedly suppresses circulating levels of luteinizing hormone (LH) and follicle-stimulating hormone (FSH) at sufficiently high doses. Consequently, levels of progesterone, androstenedione, testosterone, DHT, and estradiol are also markedly lowered at sufficiently high dosages, while an elevation in sex hormone-binding globulin (SHBG) and prolactin levels is observed.

The effective dosage of CPA for inhibition of ovulation in women, this being an antigonadotropic effect, is 1 mg/day. CPA alone has been found to suppress ovulation in 3 of 5 women at a dose of 0.5 mg/day and in 5 of 5 women at a dose of 1 mg/day in studies. Ovulation inhibition with 1–2 mg/day CPA in combination with 1–2 mg/day estradiol valerate as a birth control pill (brand name Femilar) occurred in 94.4% of 108 women during the third treatment cycle in one study and in almost 100% of 26 women over 12 treatment cycles in another study (except for one woman who ovulated during her first treatment cycle).

Oral CPA has been studied at low dosages of 5 to 20 mg/day as a potential male hormonal contraceptive. A dosage of as low as 5 to 10 mg/day oral CPA has been found to suppress circulating testosterone levels in men by 50 to 70%. For comparison with lower dosages, the suppression of circulating testosterone levels in men with a dosage of 100 mg/day oral CPA was 77% and with a dosage of 300 mg/week intramuscular CPA was 76%. Dosages of CPA of 12.5 to 25 mg/day have been used as a maintenance dosage for testosterone suppression in men with sexual deviance after initial administration of higher CPA dosages, without recurrence of symptoms. CPA is generally able to maximally suppress circulating testosterone levels by 70 to 80% in men. However, in spite of strong suppression of testosterone levels, CPA, at least by itself (e.g., without estrogen), is not usually able to reduce testosterone levels into the castrate/female range (<50 ng/dL) at any dosage, and testosterone levels generally remain just above it at levels of roughly 50 to 200 ng/dL. However, studies have reported that a very high dosage of CPA of 300 mg/day may suppress testosterone levels to around 50 ng/dL in men. CPA also suppresses estradiol levels in men, with one study finding about a 65% decrease in estradiol levels (from about 27 pg/mL to around 10 pg/mL) with 100 mg/day CPA.

CPA has been found to maximally suppress testosterone and estradiol levels in young men within 7 days of continuous administration. Following discontinuation of CPA, the recovery of testosterone levels is variable and may require 14 days to 6 months for completion. An escape or recovery phenomenon, in which testosterone levels increase over time, has been observed with long-term CPA monotherapy. In one study in aged men with prostate cancer, testosterone levels were initially suppressed by 70%, but increased to 50% of baseline levels between 6 and 12 months, remaining stable thereafter up to 24 months of therapy.

The combination of progestogens like CPA with an estrogen is synergistic in terms of antigonadotropic effect, and is able to fully suppress gonadal testosterone production even with very small doses of the estrogen. One study found that 100 to 300 mg/day CPA combined with an "extremely low" dosage of diethylstilbestrol (0.1 mg/day), a nonsteroidal estrogen, suppressed testosterone levels into the castrate range (to 30 ng/dL) in men with prostate cancer. Discontinuation of diethylstilbestrol at 5 months resulted in a rapid 6-fold increase in testosterone levels (to 135 ng/dL) and then further (to almost 200 ng/dL) by 12 months. Another study likewise found that the combination of 160 mg/day oral megestrol acetate, a progestin closely related to CPA, with 0.5 to 1.5 mg/day oral estradiol suppressed testosterone levels into the castrate range in men with prostate cancer. A study by Fung and colleagues (2017) found no difference in suppression of circulating testosterone levels (~95% suppression) in transgender women by the combination of either 25 mg/day oral CPA or 50 mg/day oral CPA with a moderate dosage of oral or transdermal estradiol (mean 3.3 mg/day oral, 3.4 g/day gel, or 95.6 μg/day patches).

A high dosage of CPA given starting 7 days prior to initiation of GnRH agonist therapy was found to prevent the GnRH agonist-induced flare in testosterone levels. The combination of 100 mg/day CPA and 0.1 mg/day diethylstilbestrol given starting 4 weeks before GnRH-agonist introduction has also been found to prevent the GnRH agonist-induced testosterone flare. CPA should be given continuously for at least a week prior to GnRH agonist initiation for an optimal preventative effect on the GnRH agonist-induced testosterone flare.

Testosterone levels with cyproterone acetate
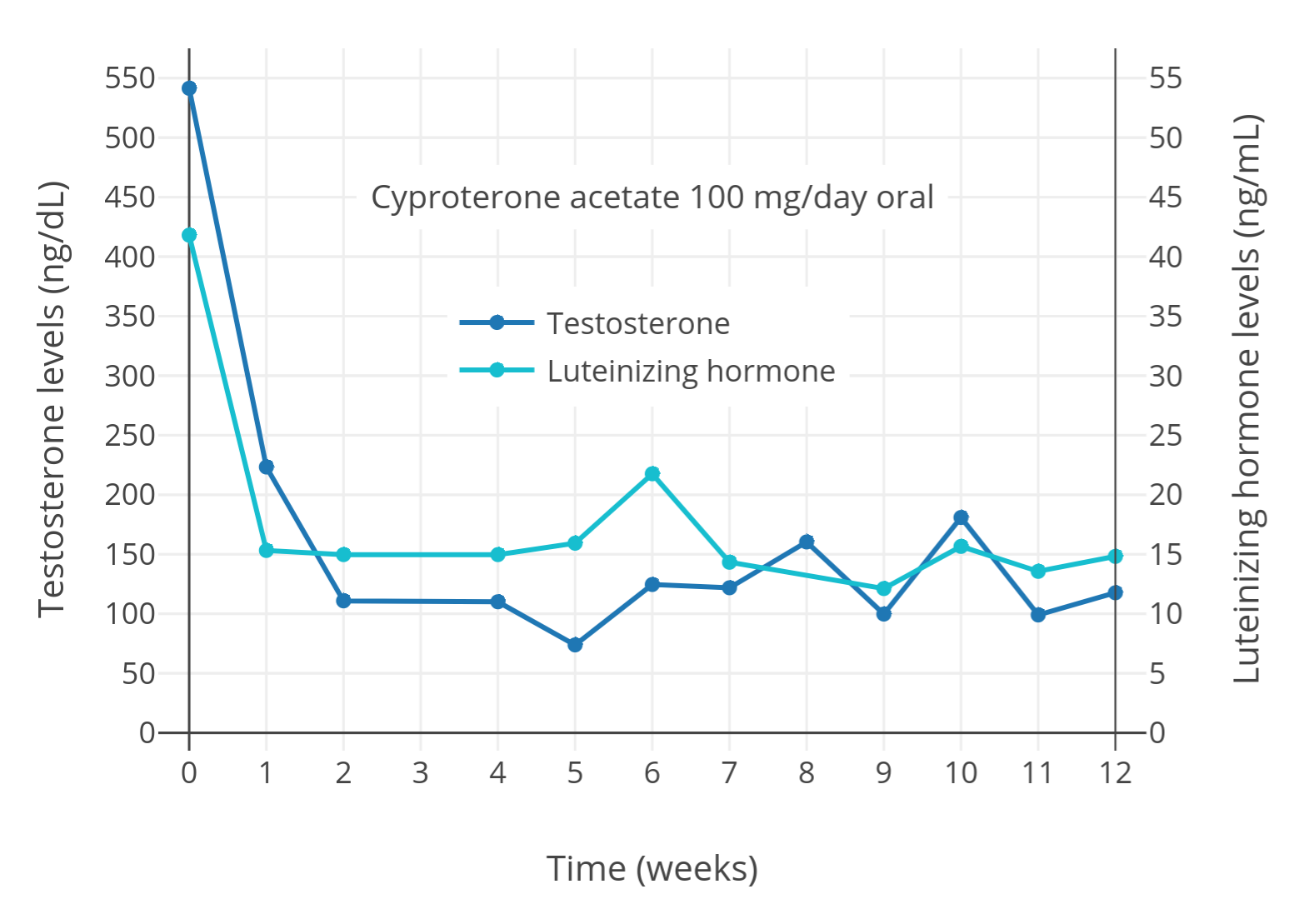
Testosterone and luteinizing hormone levels with 100 mg/day oral cyproterone acetate in men. Levels of testosterone decreased by about 80%.

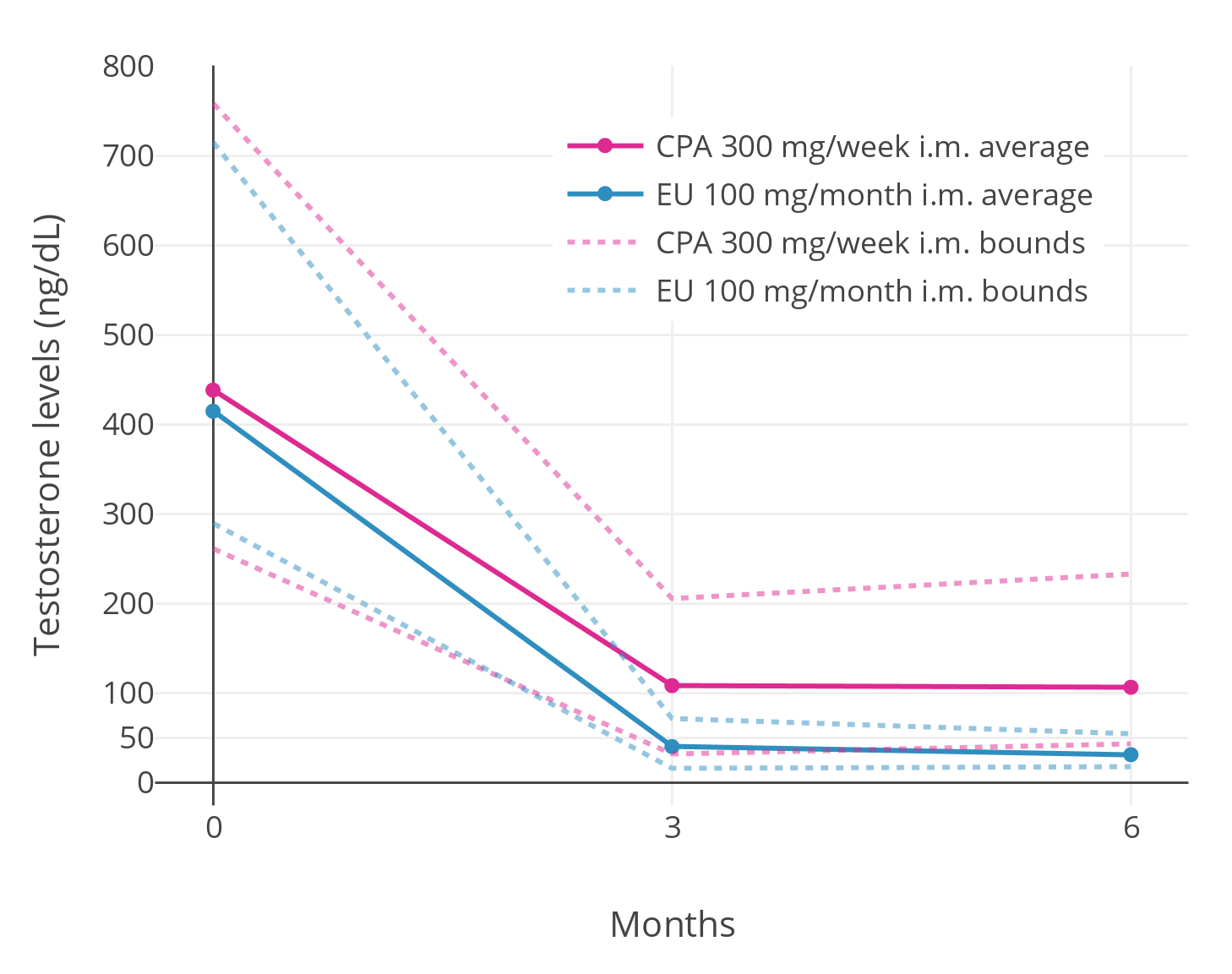
Testosterone levels with 300 mg/week cyproterone acetate or 100 mg/month estradiol undecylate both by intramuscular injection in men. Solid lines are average and dashed lines highest and lowest levels. Levels of testosterone decreased by 75% with cyproterone acetate and by 91% with estradiol undecylate.

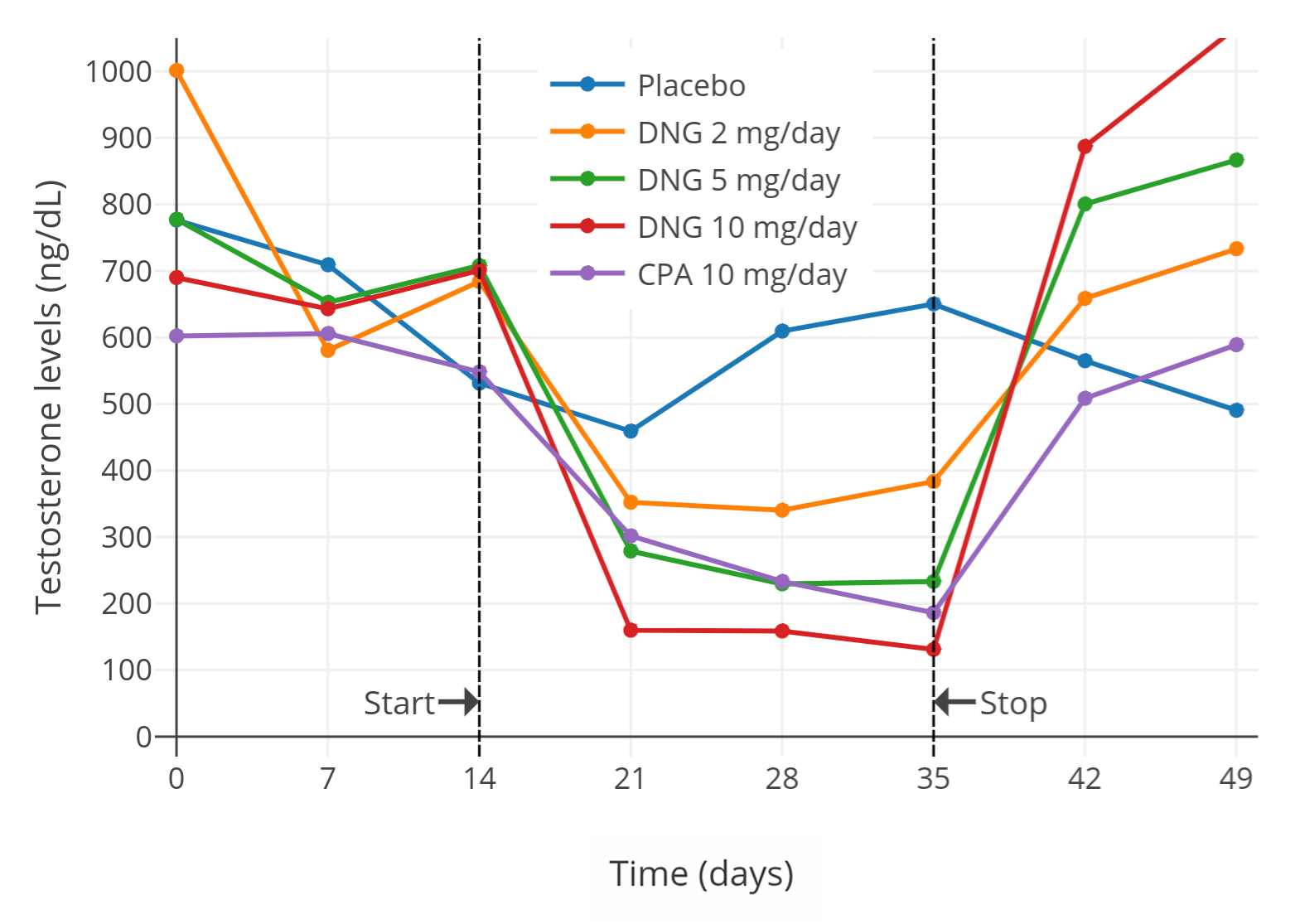
Testosterone levels with 10 mg/day oral cyproterone acetate, different doses of oral dienogest, or placebo in healthy young men. Levels of testosterone decreased by 66 ± 4%, from 600 ng/dL to 185 ng/dL.

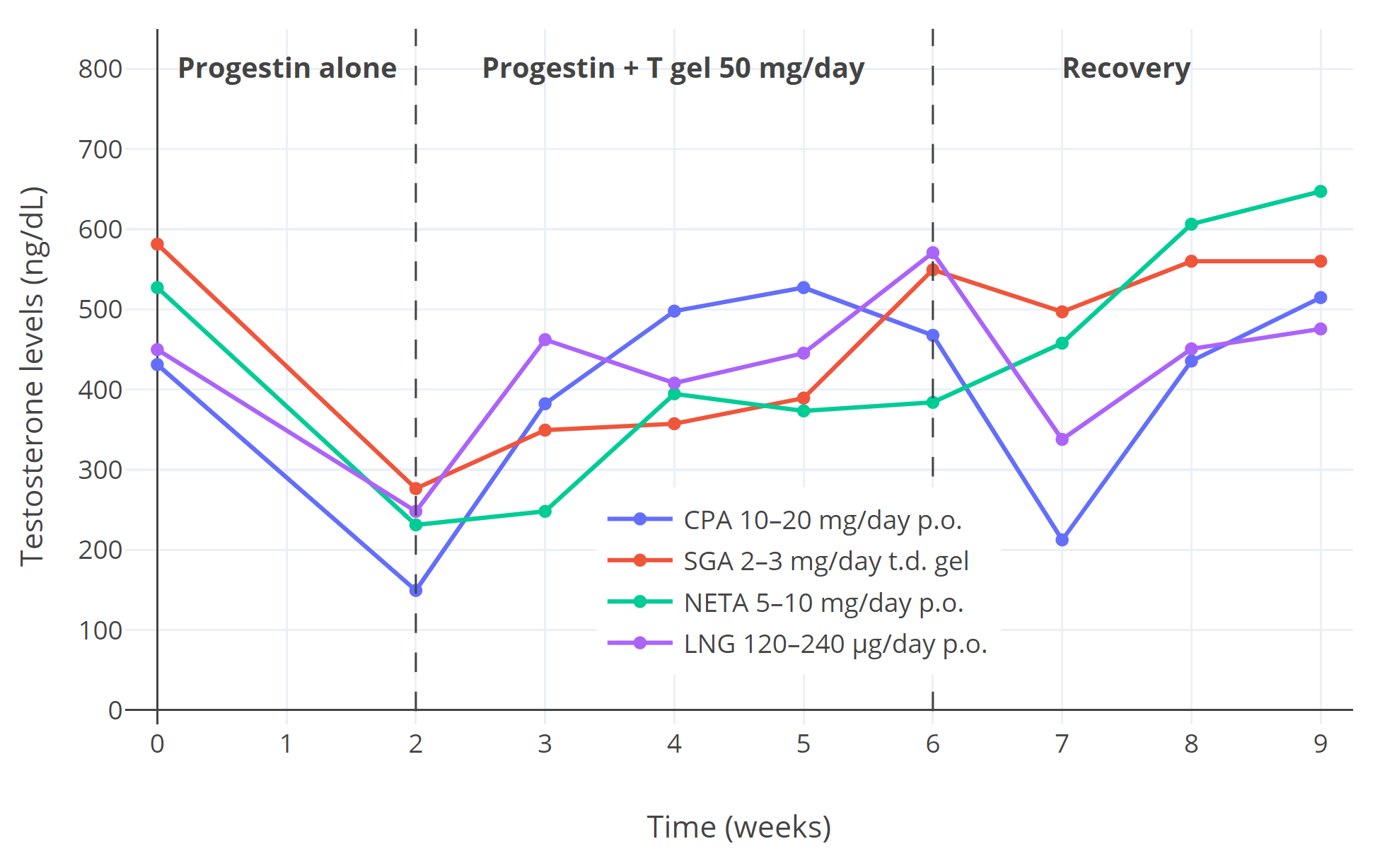
Testosterone levels with different doses of cyproterone acetate (CPA), segesterone acetate (SGA), norethisterone acetate (NETA), and levonorgestrel (LNG) alone then in combination with transdermal testosterone followed by discontinuation and recovery in healthy young men. Levels decreased by about 65% with cyproterone acetate alone. There were no differences in gonadotropin levels with 10 versus 20 mg/day cyproterone acetate and testosterone levels for the two groups were combined.

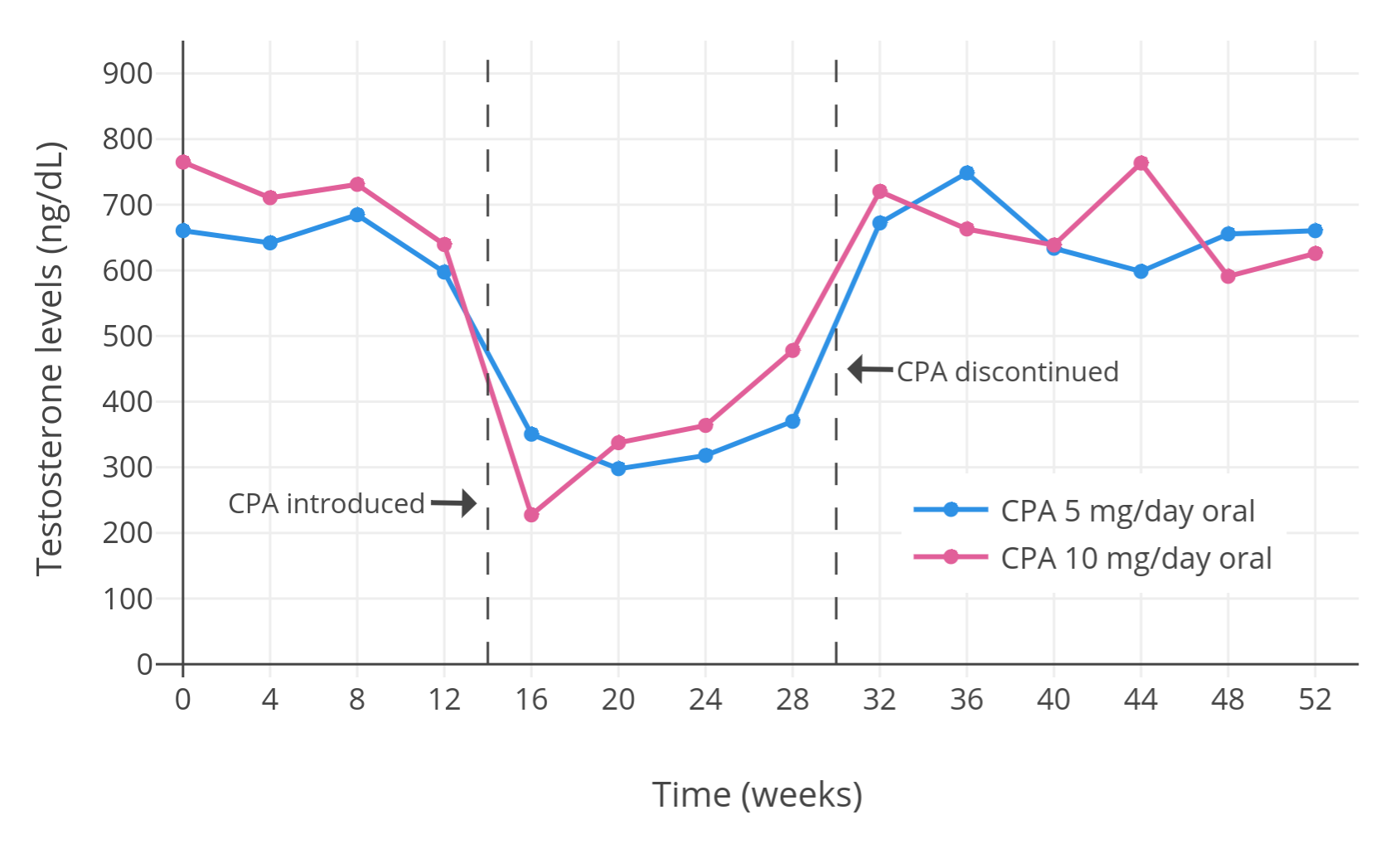
Testosterone levels with 5 or 10 mg/day oral cyproterone acetate in men. Levels of testosterone decreased by 52% with 5 mg/day and by 51% with 10 mg/day.

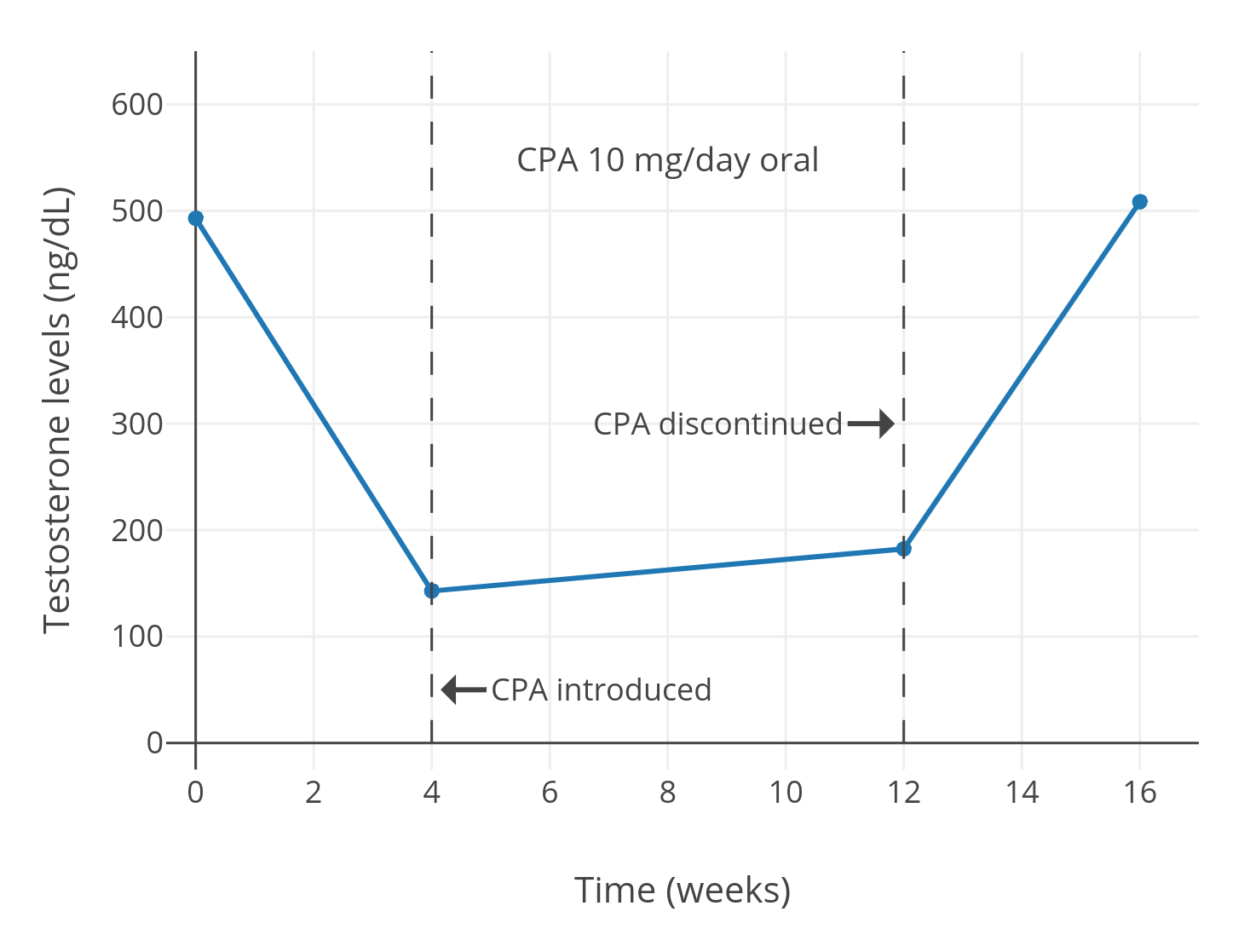
Testosterone levels with 10 mg/day oral cyproterone acetate in men. Levels of testosterone decreased by about 70%.

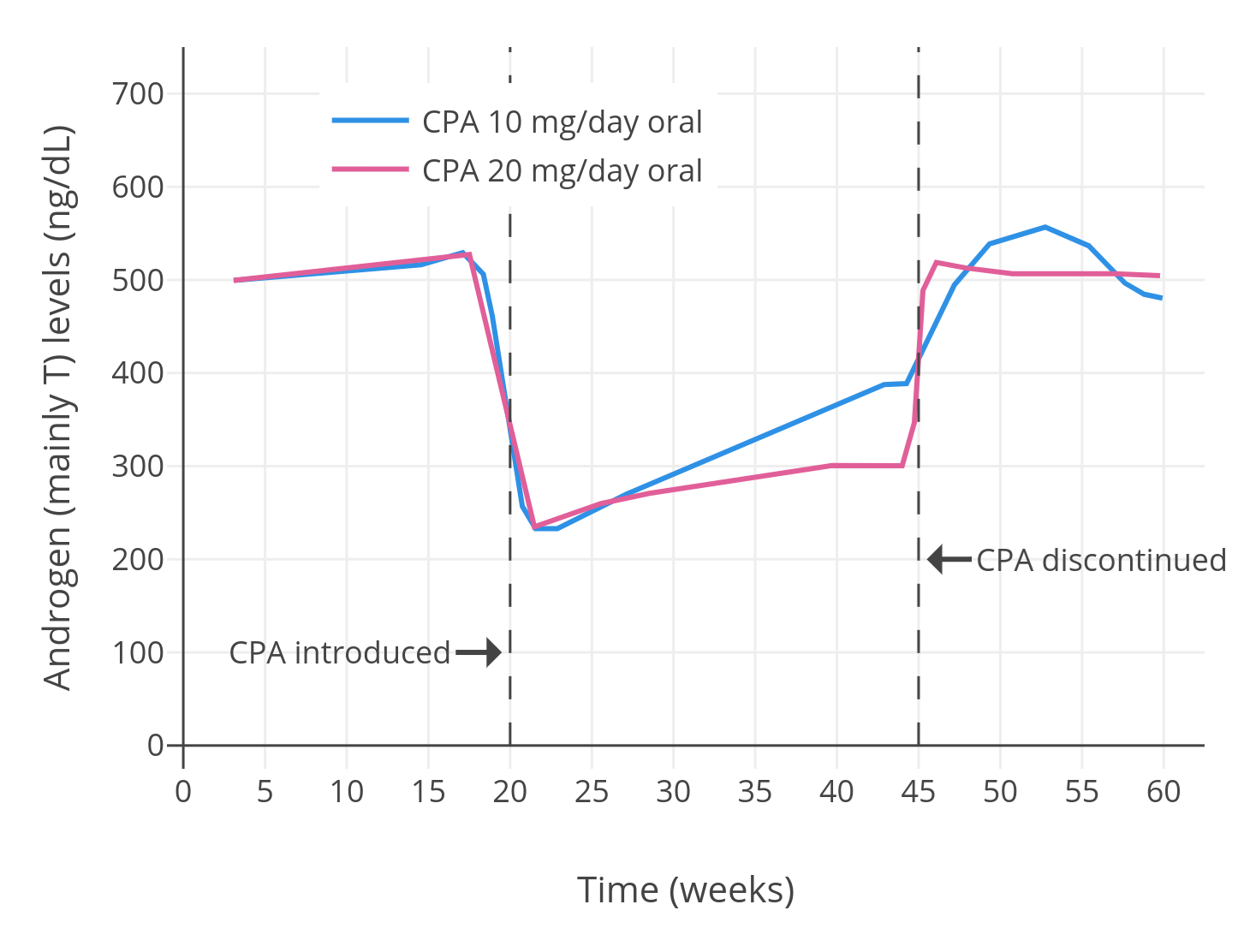
Androgen (mainly testosterone) levels with 10 or 20 mg/day oral cyproterone acetate in men. Levels of androgens decreased by about 60% with both 10 mg/day and 20 mg/day.

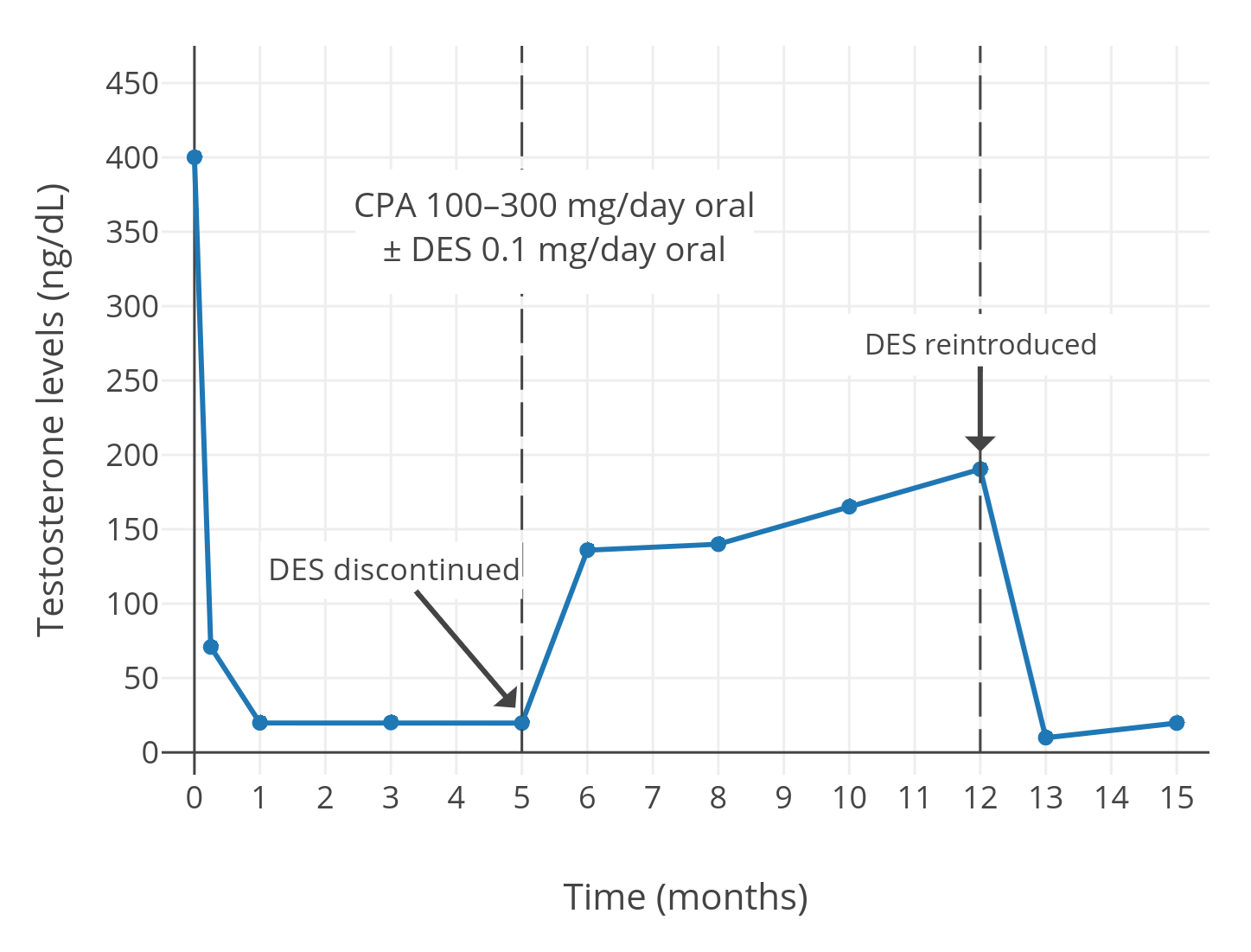
Testosterone levels with 100 to 300 mg/day oral cyproterone acetate and low-dose oral estrogen in men. The estrogen used was 0.1 mg/day diethylstilbestrol (DES), which has been described as an "extremely low" dosage. Levels of testosterone were decreased by about 95% with the combination and by about 61% with cyproterone acetate only.

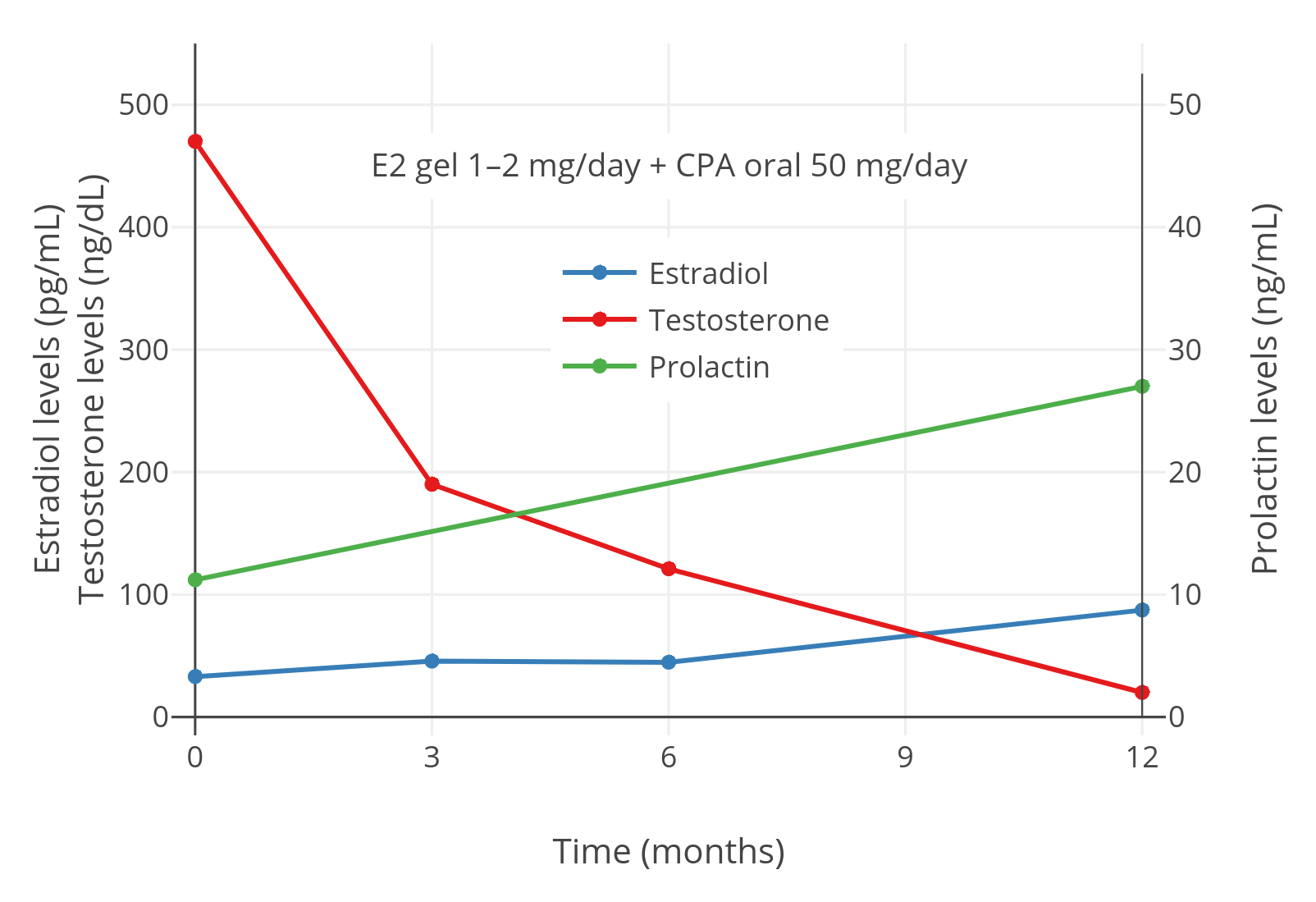
Hormone levels with 1 to 2 mg/day transdermal estradiol gel and 50 mg/day oral cyproterone acetate in transgender women. The mean dosage of estradiol gel increased between 6 and 12 months.

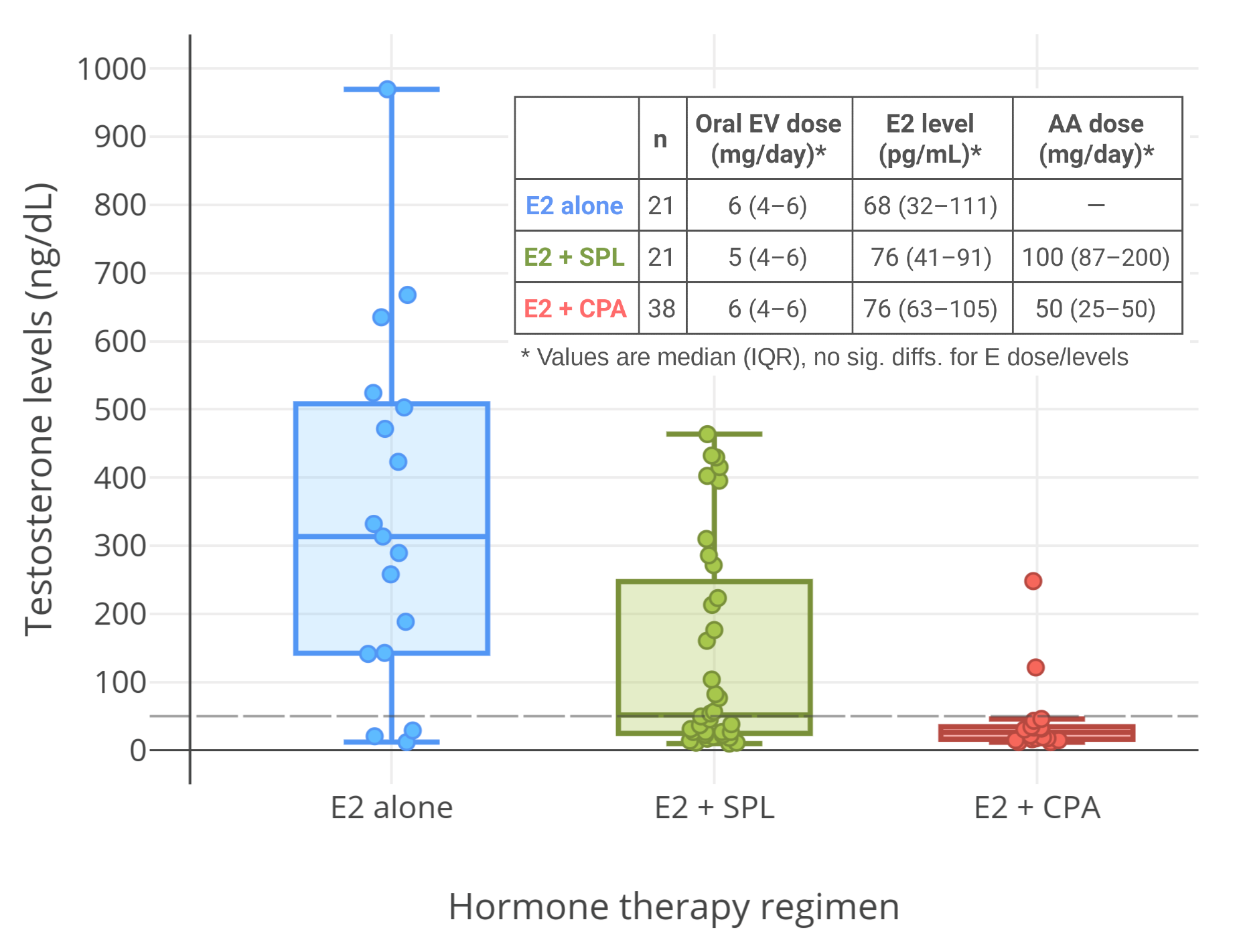
Testosterone levels with estradiol (E2) alone or in combination with an antiandrogen (AA) in the form of spironolactone (SPL) or cyproterone acetate (CPA) in transfeminine people. Estradiol was used in the form of oral estradiol valerate (EV) in almost all cases. The dashed horizontal line is the upper limit of the female/castrate range (~50 ng/dL).

=== Glucocorticoid activity ===
CPA is an agonist of the glucocorticoid receptor (GR), and has weak and partial glucocorticoid activity at high doses. In animals, CPA suppresses the secretion of adrenocorticotropic hormone (ACTH) from the pituitary gland, suppresses the production of corticosteroids like cortisol and corticosterone by the adrenal cortices, and decreases the weights of the adrenal glands and thymus. Conversely however, CPA shows no anti-inflammatory or eosinophilic effects in animals. As such, CPA, as well as related antiandrogens, show only some of the typical effects of glucocorticoids. CPA may produce mild glucucorticoid actions at high doses of more than 100 mg/day in humans. Clinically, the glucocorticoid effects of CPA appear to be relevant only at high doses in people with small body sizes (CPA exposure of more than 80 to 100 mg/m^{2}), namely in the treatment of children with precocious puberty. No signs of secondary adrenal insufficiency have been observed with CPA. While various studies have clearly shown reduced cortisol and ACTH levels and ACTH responsiveness in humans with CPA therapy, some studies contradict these findings and report no such effects even with high doses of CPA.

Due to negative feedback on the hypothalamic–pituitary-adrenal (HPA) axis, administration of exogenous glucocorticoids such as prednisone and dexamethasone suppress the secretion of adrenocorticotropic hormone (ACTH) from the pituitary gland and the production of cortisol from the adrenal glands. This results in adrenal suppression and atrophy and, upon glucocorticoid discontinuation, temporary adrenal insufficiency. Similarly, CPA both in animals and humans can weakly reduce ACTH and cortisol levels and decrease adrenal gland weight as well as cause adrenal insufficiency with discontinuation. These findings suggest that CPA possesses weak glucocorticoid properties. CPA has been reported to be an antagonist of the glucocorticoid receptor (GR) in vitro and may reduce adrenal cortisol and corticosterone production by weakly inhibiting the enzymes 3β-hydroxysteroid dehydrogenase and 21-hydroxylase. These are antiglucocorticoid actions. However, metabolites of CPA, for instance 15β-hydroxycyproterone acetate, may have differing activities. Both cyproterone and CPA have been found to possess glucocorticoid effects, and based on studies in mice, it has been suggested that CPA has approximately one-fifth of the potency of prednisone as a glucocorticoid. The glucocorticoid effects of CPA in humans appear to be less significant than those in animals.

Megestrol acetate, medroxyprogesterone acetate, and chlormadinone acetate are all steroidal progestins of the 17α-hydroxyprogesterone family and close analogues of CPA which similarly possess glucocorticoid properties and the potential for producing adrenal insufficiency upon discontinuation.

=== Other activities ===
==== Estrogenic and antiestrogenic activities ====
CPA does not bind to the estrogen receptors. Accordingly, pre-treatment with CPA does not block the retention of estradiol in the brain in mice. CPA has no estrogenic or direct antiestrogenic activity. However, CPA has been reported to produce weak estrogenic effects in rodents. In any case, CPA has prominent indirect antiestrogenic effects via its progestogenic activity. This includes PR-mediated antiestrogenic activity in certain tissues like the uterus and vagina as well as suppression of estrogen levels via its PR-mediated antigonadotropic activity. CPA also has indirect estrogenic activity in the breasts via its antiandrogenic activity, as androgens have strong functional antiestrogenic effects in this part of the body. This underlies the slight gynecomastia that can occur with CPA in men.

==== Opioid receptors ====
CPA has been found to bind to several of the opioid receptors, including the μ-, δ-, and κ-opioid receptor subtypes. However, this binding is very weak relative to its other actions (IC_{50} for inhibition of [^{3}H]diprenorphine binding = 1.62 ± 0.33 μM). It has been suggested that activation of opioid receptors might be involved in the sedation that is reportedly sometimes seen with high doses of CPA or in its reported effectiveness in the treatment of cluster headaches.

==== Aryl hydrocarbon receptor antagonist ====
CPA has been identified as an antagonist of the aryl hydrocarbon receptor and this action may be involved in its liver toxicity.

== Pharmacokinetics ==
=== Absorption ===
The oral bioavailability of CPA is 68 to 100%. The absorption of oral CPA is slow but complete, and the medication is not subject to a significant first-pass effect. The mean absorption half-life of oral CPA is about 1.5 hours. Steady-state levels of CPA occur with oral CPA after about 8 days of continuous administration, with a 2- to 3-fold gradual accumulation in CPA levels. Oral CPA is taken daily and intramuscular CPA is administered weekly or biweekly.

Following a single low oral dose of 2 mg CPA in combination with 35 or 50 μg ethinylestradiol in premenopausal women, mean peak levels of CPA of 7.2 to 15.2 ng/mL (17–36.5 nmol/L) have been recorded after 1.6 to 3.7 hours. In healthy men, a single high oral dose of 100 mg CPA produced maximal CPA levels of 254 ng/mL (609 nmol/L) after 2.6 hours. In aged men with prostate cancer, continuous oral CPA therapy resulted in CPA levels of 132 ± 18 ng/mL at 25 mg/day, 246 ± 13 ng/mL at 50 mg/day, and 348 ± 23 ng/mL at 100 mg/day. Similarly, in healthy young women, a single high oral dose of 100 mg CPA resulted in peak CPA levels of 255 ng/mL (612 nmol/L) within 2 to 3 hours. During continuous treatment with high oral doses of CPA in women with hirsutism, levels of CPA were 199 to 228 ng/mL (477–547 nmol/L) with 50 mg/day CPA and were 436 to 520 ng/mL (1050–1250 nmol/L) with 100 mg/day CPA.

After a single intramuscular injection of 300 mg CPA in healthy young women, maximal levels of CPA of 191 ng/mL (458 nmol/L) and of 15β-OH-CPA of 164 ng/mL occurred after 2 to 4 days. During continuous weekly intramuscular injections of CPA in men with prostate cancer, mean levels of CPA roughly doubled from 170 ng/mL (408 nmol/L) after the first injection to 310 ng/mL (744 nmol/L) after the fifth injection, and were projected to increase to 350 to 400 ng/mL (840–960 nmol/L) after around 8 to 12 injections. The area-under-the-curve (AUC; total exposure) levels of CPA with 100 mg/day oral CPA and 300 mg/week intramuscular CPA may be approximately equivalent.

Cyproterone acetate levels with oral and intramuscular cyproterone acetate
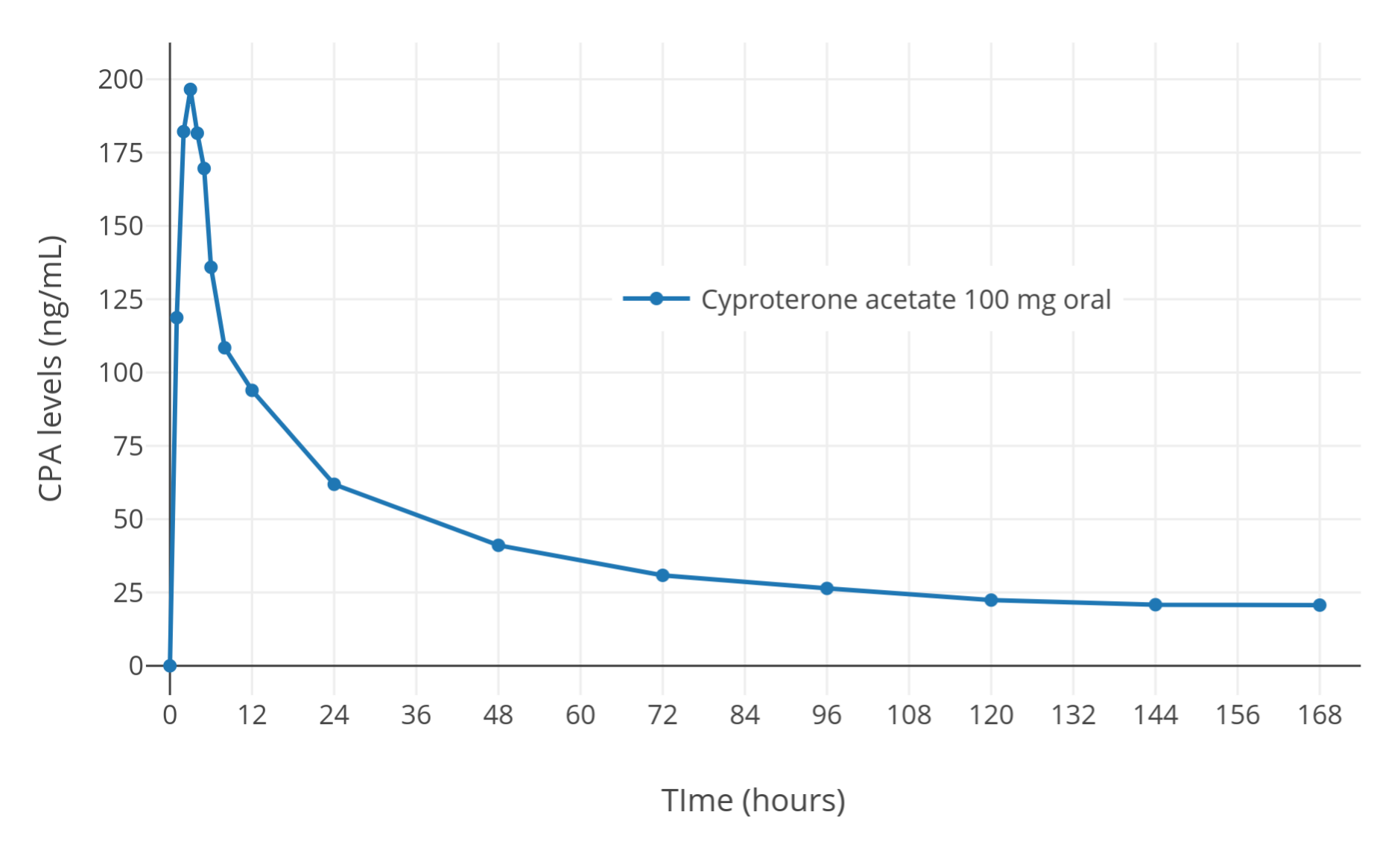
CPA levels after a single oral dose of 100 mg CPA in men.

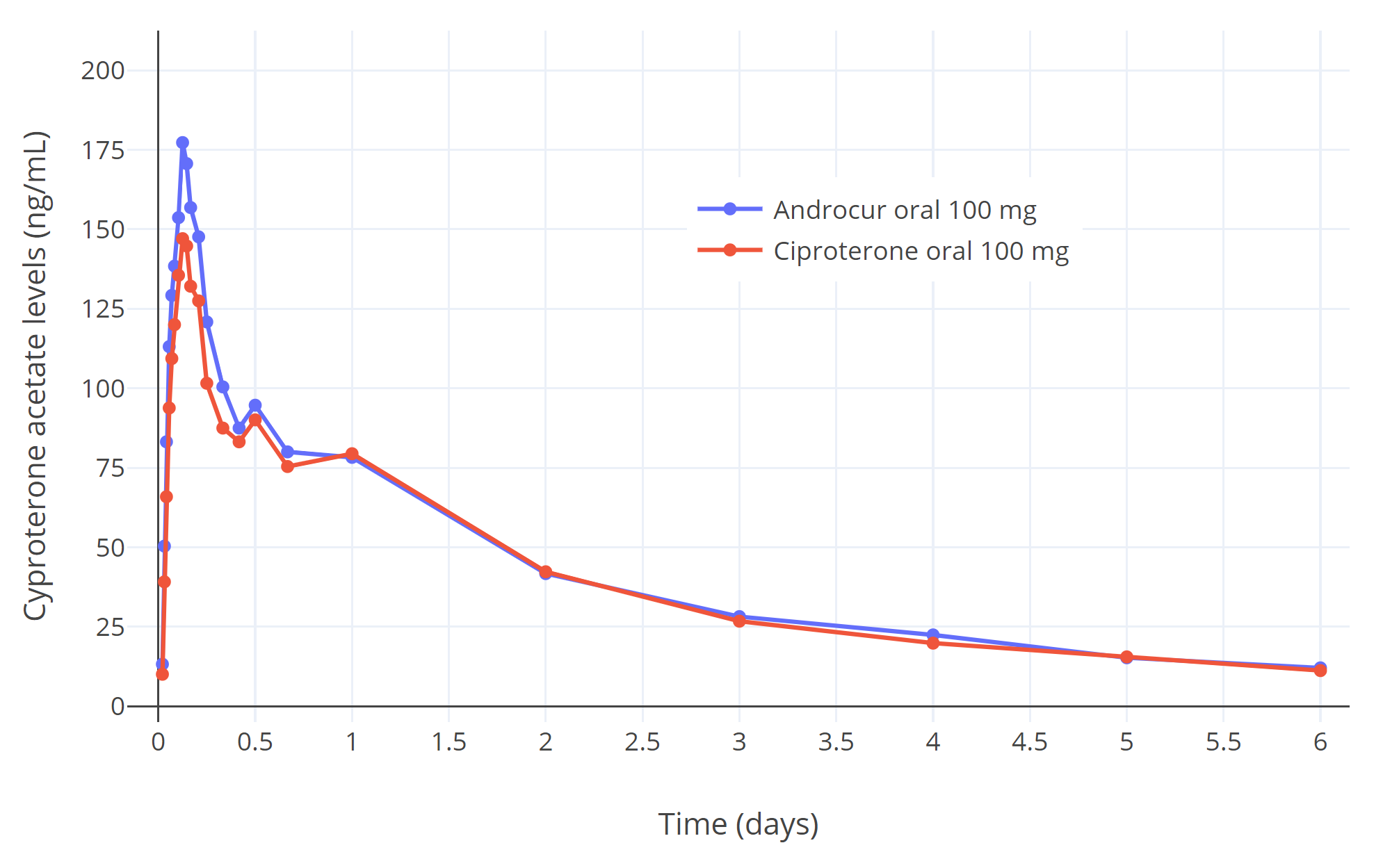
CPA levels after a single oral dose of 100 mg CPA (Androcur or Ciproterone) in men.

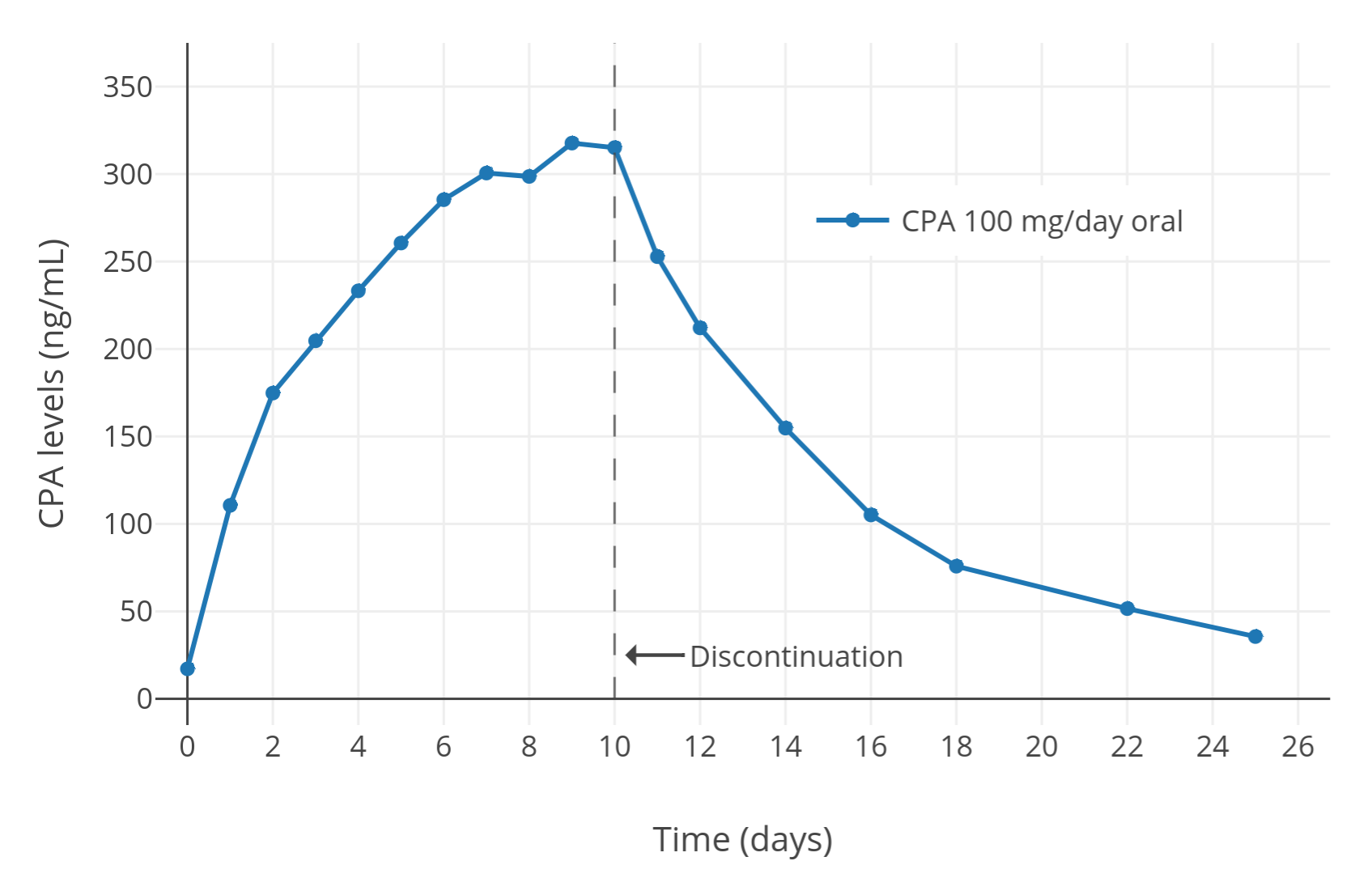
Cyproterone acetate levels with 100 mg oral cyproterone acetate per day in women. Administration was stopped at day 10.

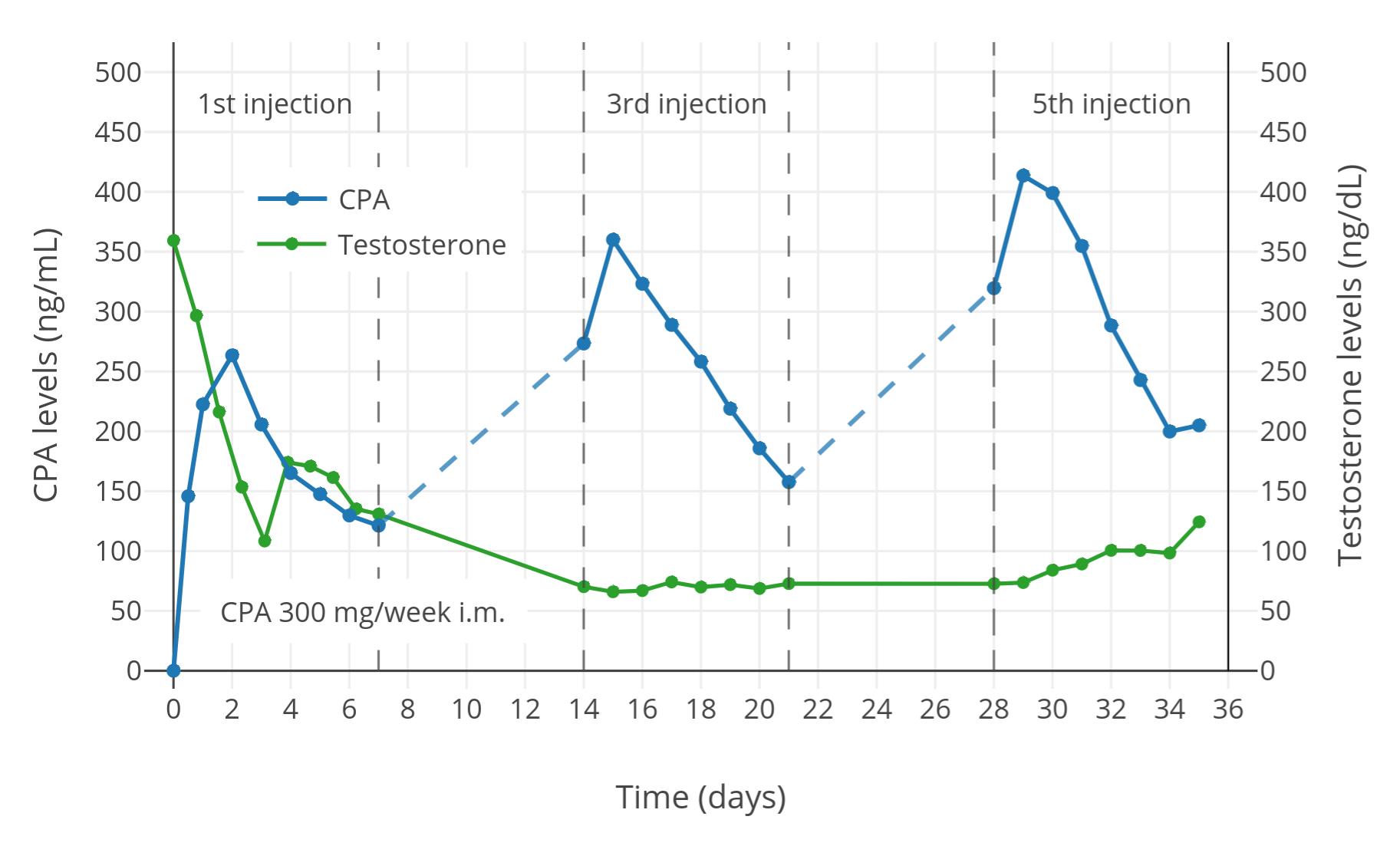
CPA and testosterone levels with continuous 300 mg/week CPA in oil solution by intramuscular injection in men. Five injections were administered total but CPA and testosterone levels were determined only for the 1st, 3rd, and 5th injections.

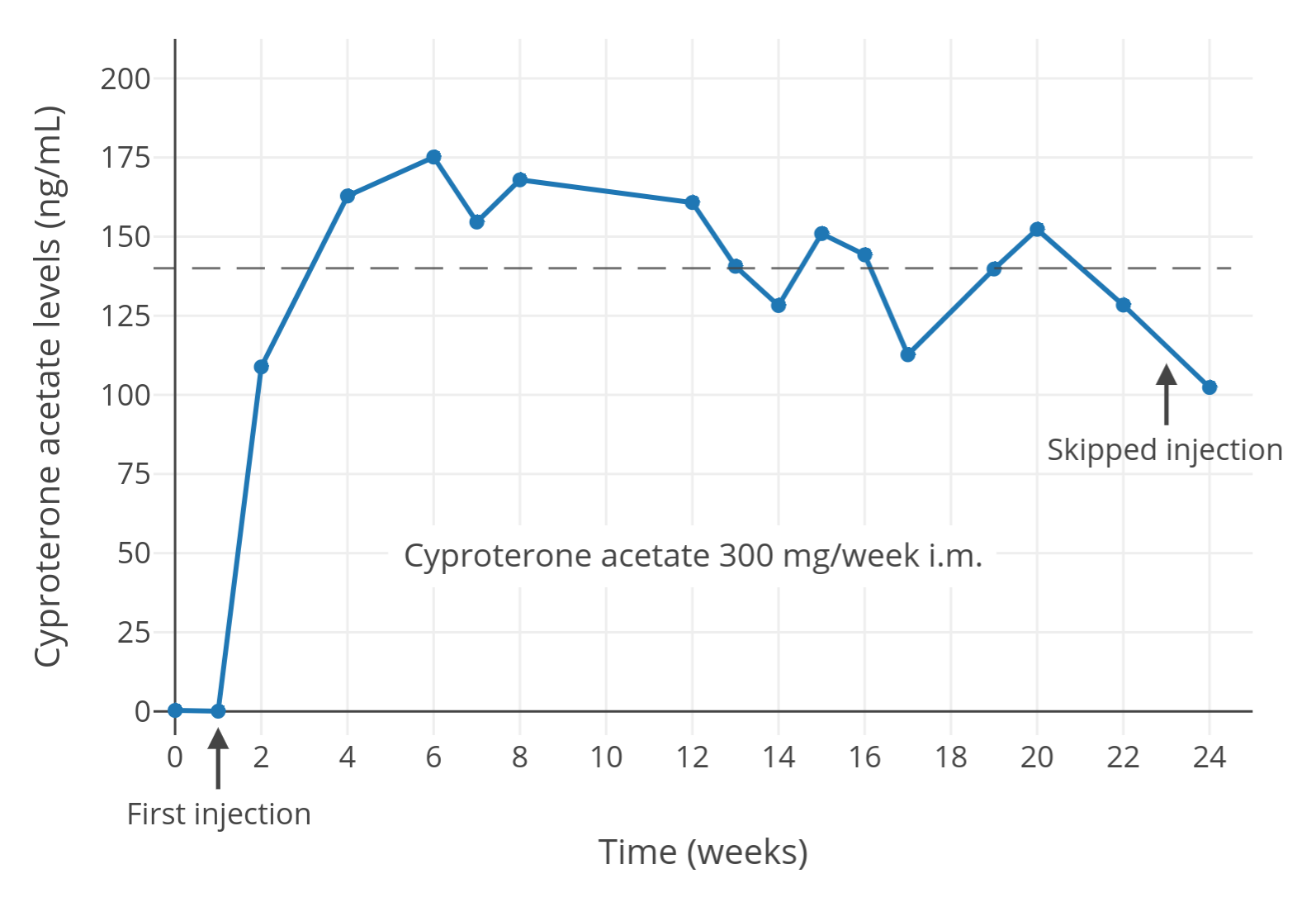
CPA levels with continuous 300 mg/week CPA in oil solution by intramuscular injection in men. The first injection was at week 1 and the injection for week 23 was skipped. The dashed line shows average levels.

=== Distribution ===
With oral CPA, there is a probable distribution phase of CPA into tissues which lasts about 12 hours and has a half-life of 3 hours. CPA is very lipophilic, and it is sequestered into fat, which provides a depot effect. The volume of distribution of CPA is 20.6 ± 3.5 L/kg. CPA crosses the blood–brain barrier, which is evidenced by the suppression of gonadotropin secretion that is observed during therapy with it (the site of action of this effect being the pituitary gland, a part of the brain). In terms of plasma protein binding, CPA does not bind to SHBG or corticosteroid-binding globulin and is instead bound exclusively to albumin (93%), with the remainder (7%) circulating free or unbound. The affinity of CPA for SHBG is very low at about 0.006% of that of testosterone or DHT.

=== Metabolism ===
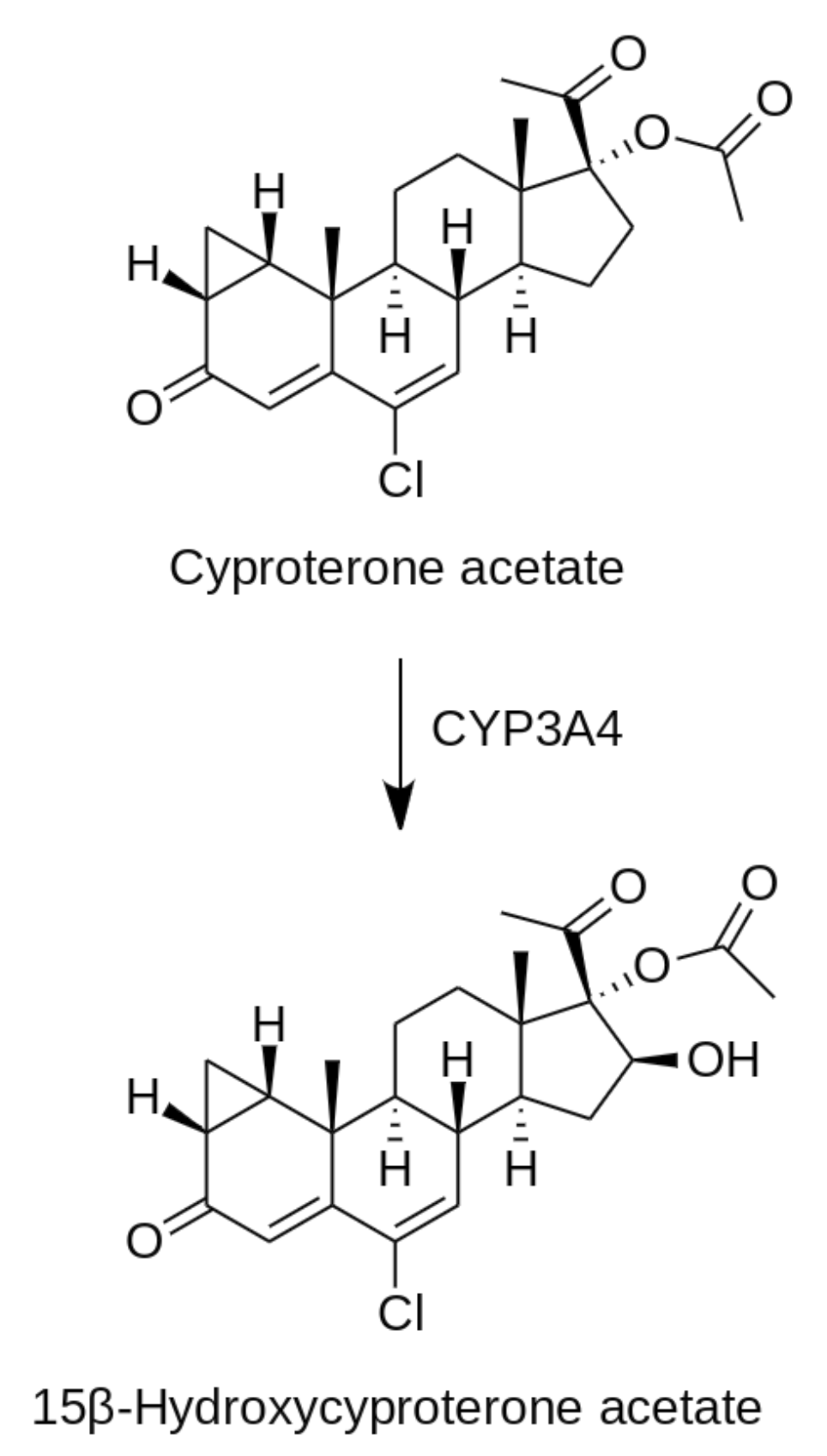
Metabolism of CPA.

CPA is metabolized primarily by hydroxylation via CYP3A4, forming the major active metabolite 15β-hydroxycyproterone acetate. This metabolite circulates at concentrations approximately twice those of CPA, and has similar antiandrogen activity to that of CPA but only 10% of its activity as a progestogen. As a result, the co-administration of CPA with drugs which inhibit CYP3A4 may increase its potency as a progestogen.

Some CPA is reportedly metabolized by hydrolysis into cyproterone and acetic acid. However, unlike many other steroid esters, CPA is not extensively hydrolyzed, and much of the pharmacological activity of the drug is attributable to CPA itself in its unchanged form. Cyproterone has approximately one-third the potency of CPA as an antiandrogen and is devoid of progestogenic activity.

The elimination half-life of oral CPA is relatively long at approximately 1.6 to 2.2 days (38 to 53 hours), but possibly as long as 3.6 to 4.3 days (86 to 100 hours). The half-life of 15β-OH-CPA with oral administration of CPA is 2.6 days. The elimination half-life of CPA is prolonged in obese patients, which may be due to relatively greater storage of CPA in fat. The elimination half-life of CPA is also longer in older individuals; it is approximately twice as long in elderly men than in younger men (95 hours and 45 hours, respectively). When given via depot intramuscular injection, CPA has an elimination half-life of 3 to 4.3 days while 15β-OH-CPA has a half-life of 5.2 days. The duration of action of a single intramuscular injection of CPA is about 14 to 20 days. The serum total clearance of CPA is approximately 2.32 ± 0.38 mL/min/kg. Levels of CPA and 15β-OH-CPA with oral administration decrease biphasically over a period of 24 to 120 hours.

The elimination of CPA appears to be biphasic. In one study, a peak at 3.4 hours post-dose with an initial half-life of 3.4 hours and later half-life of 1.6 days was observed following a single 50 mg oral dose of CPA. The high lipophilicity and fat storage of CPA may be the reason for its longer subsequent half-life.

=== Excretion ===
CPA is excreted 70% in feces and 30% in urine.
