= Cypro =

Cypro may refer to:

- Cyprus (prefix Cypro-), an island country in the Eastern Mediterranean Sea
- Cyproterone acetate, also known as CPA and Androcur, an antiandrogen and progestogen

== See also ==
- Cipro, a trade name for the antibiotic ciprofloxacin
