= 15β-Hydroxycyproterone acetate =

Chemical compound

Clinical data
- Other names: 15β-Hydroxy-CPA; 15β-OH-CPA; 6-Chloro-15β,17α-dihydroxy-1α,2α-methylenepregna-4,6-diene-3,20-dione 17α-acetate; 6-Chloro-1,2α-methylene-15β,17α-dihydroxy-δ^{6}-progesterone 17α-acetate

Identifiers
- IUPAC name: (1R,3aS,3bR,8bS,8cS,10aS)-1-acetyl-5-chloro-3-hydroxy-8b,10a-dimethyl-7-oxo-1,2,3,3a,3b,7,7a,8,8a,8b,8c,9,10,10a-tetradecahydrocyclopenta[a]cyclopropa[g]phenanthren-1-yl acetate
- CAS Number: 65423-26-9 114884-50-3 (non-specific stereochemistry)
- PubChem CID: 10025840
- ChemSpider: 170395
- UNII: 54AF4JYT3F

Chemical and physical data
- Formula: C_{24}H_{29}ClO_{5}
- Molar mass: 432.94 g·mol^{−1}
- 3D model (JSmol): Interactive image
- SMILES: CC(=O)[C@]1(CC([C@@H]2[C@@]1(CC[C@H]3[C@H]2C=C(C4=CC(=O)[C@@H]5C[C@@H]5[C@]34C)Cl)C)O)OC(=O)C
- InChI: InChI=1S/C24H29ClO5/c1-11(26)24(30-12(2)27)10-20(29)21-14-8-18(25)17-9-19(28)13-7-16(13)23(17,4)15(14)5-6-22(21,24)3/h8-9,13-16,20-21,29H,5-7,10H2,1-4H3/t13-,14-,15+,16+,20?,21-,22+,23+,24+/m1/s1; Key:HRANPRDGABOKNQ-XHLVMSDXSA-N

15β-Hydroxycyproterone acetate (15β-OH-CPA) is a steroidal antiandrogen and the major metabolite of cyproterone acetate (CPA). It is formed from CPA in the liver by hydroxylation via the cytochrome P450 enzyme CYP3A4. During therapy with CPA, 15β-OH-CPA circulates at concentrations that are approximately twice those of CPA. 15β-OH-CPA has similar or even greater antiandrogen activity compared to CPA. However, it has only about one-tenth of the activity of CPA as a progestogen. 15β-OH-CPA also shows some glucocorticoid activity, similarly to CPA and unesterified cyproterone.

== See also ==
- List of steroidal antiandrogens
