= Cyproterone acetate =

Chemical compound

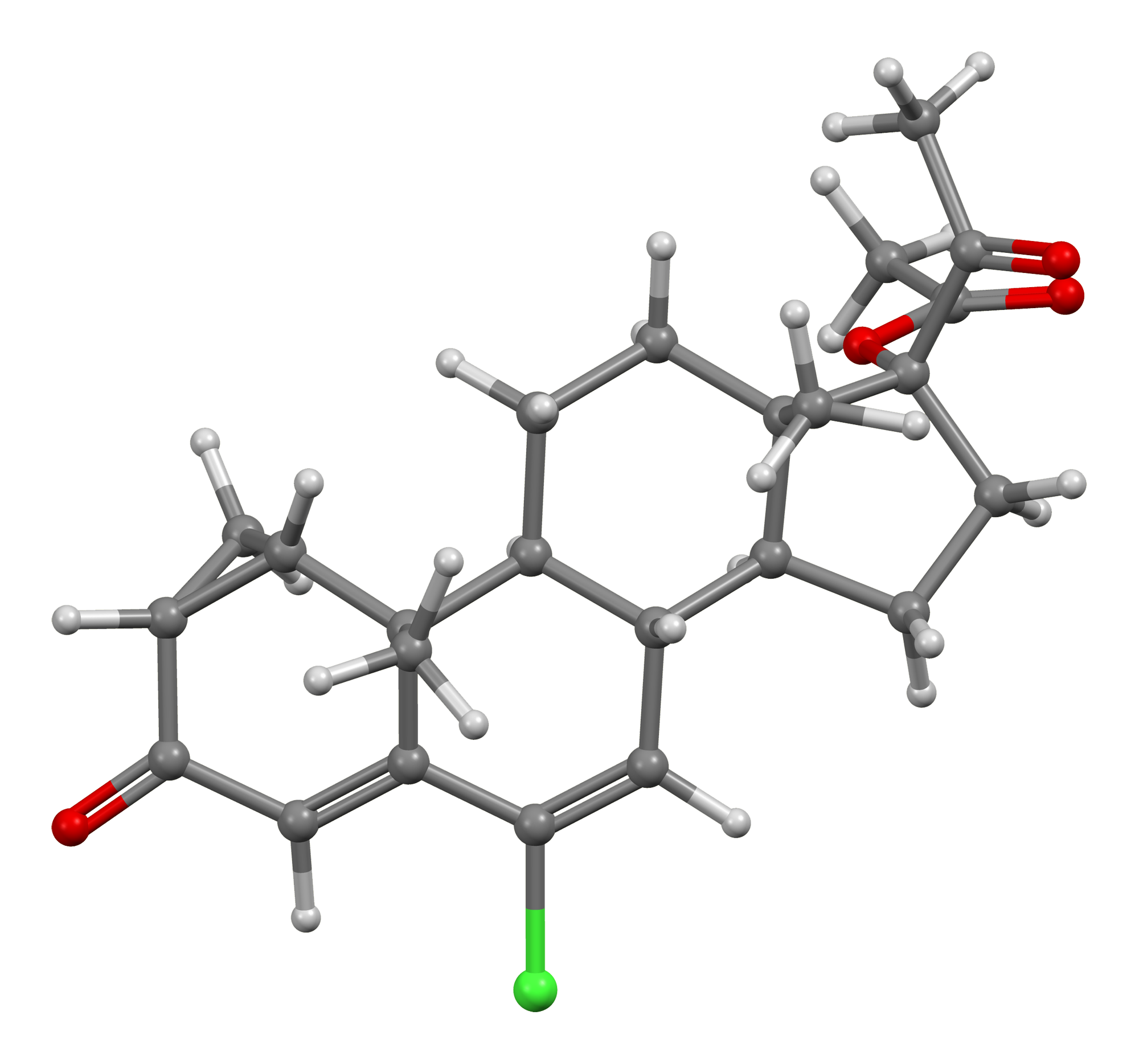

Clinical data
- Trade names: Androcur, Androcur Depot, Cyprostat, Siterone, Procur, others
- Other names: SH-80714; SH-714; NSC-81430; 1α,2α-Methylene-6-chloro-17α-hydroxy-δ^{6}-progesterone acetate; 1α,2α-Methylene-6-chloro-17α-hydroxypregna-4,6-diene-3,20-dione acetate
- AHFS/Drugs.com: Micromedex Detailed Consumer Information
- Pregnancy category: X
- Routes of administration: By mouth, intramuscular
- Drug class: Steroidal antiandrogen; Progestin; Progestogen ester; Antigonadotropin
- ATC code: G03HA01 (WHO)

Legal status
- Legal status: In general: ℞ (Prescription only)

Pharmacokinetic data
- Bioavailability: Oral: 68–100%
- Protein binding: Albumin: 93% Free: 7%
- Metabolism: Hepatic (CYP3A4)
- Metabolites: • 15β-OH-CPA (major) • Cyproterone (minor) • Acetic acid (minor)
- Elimination half-life: Oral: 1.6–4.3 days IM: 3–4.3 days
- Excretion: Feces: 70% Urine: 30%

Identifiers
- IUPAC name: (2aR,3aS,3bS,3cS,5aS,6R,8aS,8bR)-6-acetyl-10-chloro-3b,5a-dimethyl-2-oxo-2,2a,3,3a,3b,3c,4,5,5a,6,7,8,8a,8b-tetradecahydrocyclopenta[a]cyclopropa[g]phenanthren-6-yl acetate
- CAS Number: 427-51-0 2098-66-0 (free alcohol)
- PubChem CID: 9880
- IUPHAR/BPS: 2865
- DrugBank: DB04839
- ChemSpider: 9496
- UNII: 4KM2BN5JHF
- KEGG: D01368
- ChEBI: CHEBI:50743
- ChEMBL: ChEMBL139835
- CompTox Dashboard (EPA): DTXSID5020366
- ECHA InfoCard: 100.006.409

Chemical and physical data
- Formula: C_{24}H_{29}ClO_{4}
- Molar mass: 416.94 g·mol^{−1}
- 3D model (JSmol): Interactive image
- Melting point: 200 to 201 °C (392 to 394 °F)
- SMILES: CC(=O)[C@]1(CC[C@@H]2[C@@]1(CC[C@H]3[C@H]2C=C(C4=CC(=O)[C@@H]5C[C@@H]5[C@]34C)Cl)C)OC(=O)C
- InChI: InChI=1S/C24H29ClO4/c1-12(26)24(29-13(2)27)8-6-16-14-10-20(25)19-11-21(28)18(15)23(19,4)17(14)5-7-22(16,24)3/h10-11,14-18H,5-9H2,1-4H3/t14-,15+,16-,17-,18-,22-,23-,24-/m0/s1; Key:UWFYSQMTEOIJJG-FDTZYFLXSA-N

Cyproterone acetate (CPA), sold alone under the brand name Androcur or with ethinylestradiol under the brand names Diane or Diane-35 among others, is an antiandrogen and progestin medication used in the treatment of androgen-dependent conditions such as acne, excessive body hair growth, early puberty, and prostate cancer, as a component of feminizing hormone therapy for transgender individuals, and in birth control pills. It is formulated and used both alone and in combination with an estrogen. CPA is taken by mouth one to three times per day.

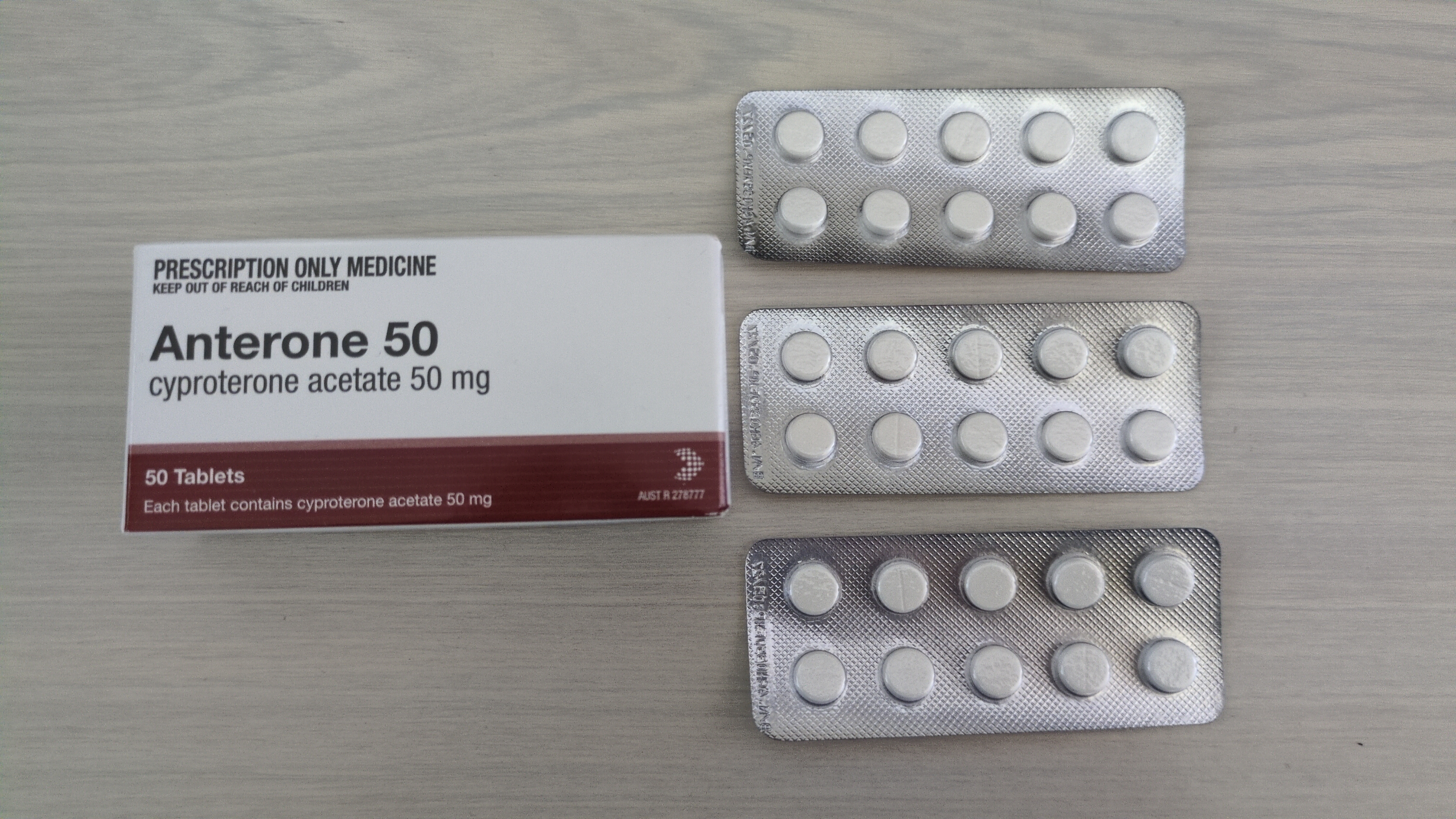
Anterone (cyproterone acetate) 50 mg oral tablets in Australia

Common side effects of high-dose CPA in men include gynecomastia (breast development) and feminization. In both men and women, possible side effects of CPA include low sex hormone levels, reversible infertility, sexual dysfunction, fatigue, depression, weight gain, and elevated liver enzymes. At very high doses in older individuals, significant cardiovascular complications can occur. Rare but serious adverse reactions of CPA include blood clots, and liver damage. CPA can also cause adrenal insufficiency as a withdrawal effect if it is discontinued abruptly from a high dosage. CPA blocks the effects of androgens such as testosterone in the body, which it does by preventing them from interacting with their biological target, the androgen receptor (AR), and by reducing their production by the gonads, hence their concentrations in the body. In addition, it has progesterone-like effects by activating the progesterone receptor (PR). It can also produce weak cortisol-like effects at very high doses.

CPA was discovered in 1961. It was originally developed as a progestin. In 1965, the antiandrogenic effects of CPA were discovered. CPA was first marketed, as an antiandrogen, in 1973, and was the first antiandrogen to be introduced for medical use. A few years later, in 1978, CPA was introduced as a progestin in a birth control pill. It has been described as a "first-generation" progestin and as the prototypical antiandrogen. CPA is available widely throughout the world. An exception is the United States, where it is not approved for use.

== Medical uses ==
CPA is used as a progestin and antiandrogen in hormonal birth control and in the treatment of androgen-dependent conditions. Specifically, CPA is used in combined birth control pills, in the treatment of androgen-dependent skin and hair conditions such as acne, seborrhea, excessive hair growth, and scalp hair loss, high androgen levels, in transgender hormone therapy, to treat prostate cancer, to reduce sex drive in sex offenders or men with paraphilias or hypersexuality, to treat early puberty, and for other uses. Treatment dosages range from 2mg or less, to 100mg or more daily.

In the United States, where CPA is not available, other medications with antiandrogenic effects are used to treat androgen-dependent conditions instead. Examples of such medications include gonadotropin-releasing hormone modulators (GnRH modulators) like leuprorelin and degarelix, nonsteroidal antiandrogens like flutamide and bicalutamide, the diuretic and steroidal antiandrogen spironolactone, the progestin medroxyprogesterone acetate, and the 5α-reductase inhibitors finasteride and dutasteride. The steroidal antiandrogen and progestin chlormadinone acetate is used as an alternative to CPA in Japan, South Korea, and a few other countries.

In 2020, the European Medicine Agency issued a warning that high doses of cyproterone acetate (25mg daily or more) may contribute to risk of meningioma, and recommended physicians use alternative treatment for most indications (or the minimum effective dose where no alternatives were available) with the exception of prostate carcinoma.

=== Birth control ===
CPA is used with ethinylestradiol as a combined birth control pill to prevent pregnancy. This birth control combination has been available since 1978. The formulation is taken once daily for 21 days, followed by a 7-day free interval. CPA has also been available in combination with estradiol valerate (brand name Femilar) as a combined birth control pill in Finland since 1993. High-dose CPA tablets have a contraceptive effect and can be used as a form of birth control, although they are not specifically licensed as such.

=== Skin and hair conditions ===
==== Females ====
CPA is used as an antiandrogen to treat androgen-dependent skin and hair conditions such as acne, seborrhea, hirsutism (excessive hair growth), scalp hair loss, and hidradenitis suppurativa in women. These conditions are worsened by the presence of androgens, and by suppressing androgen levels and blocking their actions, CPA improves the symptoms of these conditions. CPA is used to treat such conditions both at low doses as a birth control pill and on its own at higher doses. A birth control pill containing low-dose CPA in combination with ethinylestradiol to treat acne has been found to result in overall improvement in 75 to 90% of women, with responses approaching 100% improvement. High-dose CPA alone likewise has been found to improve symptoms of acne by 75 to 90% in women. Discontinuation of CPA has been found to result in marked recurrence of symptoms in up to 70% of women. CPA is one of the most commonly used medications in the treatment of hirsutism, hyperandrogenism, and polyendocrine metabolic ovarian syndrome (PMOS) in women throughout the world.

Higher dosages of CPA are used in combination with an estrogen specifically at doses of 25 to 100 mg/day cyclically in the treatment of hirsutism in women. The efficacy of such dosages of CPA in the treatment of hirsutism in women appear to be similar to that of spironolactone, flutamide, and finasteride. Randomized controlled trials have found that higher dosages of CPA (e.g., 20 mg/day or 100 mg/day) added cyclically to a birth control pill containing ethinylestradiol and 2 mg/day CPA were no more effective or only marginally more effective in the treatment of severe hirsutism in women than the birth control pill alone. Maintenance therapy with lower doses of CPA, such as 25 mg/day, has been found to be effective in preventing relapse of symptoms of hirsutism. CPA has typically been combined with ethinylestradiol, but it can alternatively be used in combination with hormone replacement therapy dosages of estradiol instead. CPA at a dosage of 50 mg/day in combination with 100 μg/day transdermal estradiol patches has been found to be effective in the treatment of hirsutism similarly to the combination of CPA with ethinylestradiol.

The efficacy of the combination of an estrogen and CPA in the treatment of hirsutism in women appears to be due to marked suppression of total and free androgen levels as well as additional blockade of the androgen receptor.

==== Males ====
CPA has been found to be effective in the treatment of acne in males, with marked improvement in symptoms observed at dosages of 25, 50, and 100 mg/day in different studies. It can also halt further progression of scalp hair loss in men. Increased head hair and decreased body hair has been observed with CPA in men with scalp hair loss. However, its side effects in men, such as demasculinization, gynecomastia, sexual dysfunction, bone density loss, and reversible infertility, make the use of CPA in males impractical in most cases. In addition, lower dosages of CPA, such as 25 mg/day, have been found to be better-tolerated in men. But such doses also show lower effectiveness in the treatment of acne in men.

=== High androgen levels ===
CPA is used as an antiandrogen to treat high androgen levels and associated symptoms such as masculinization due to conditions like polyendocrine metabolic ovarian syndrome (PMOS) and congenital adrenal hyperplasia (CAH) in women. It is almost always combined with an estrogen, such as ethinylestradiol, when it is used in the treatment of PMOS in women.

=== Menopausal hormone therapy ===
CPA is used at low doses in menopausal hormone therapy in combination with an estrogen to provide endometrial protection and treat menopausal symptoms. It is used in menopausal hormone therapy under the brand name Climen, which is a sequential preparation that contains 2 mg estradiol valerate and 1 mg CPA. Climen was the first product for use in menopausal hormone therapy containing CPA to be marketed. It is available in more than 40 countries.

=== Transgender hormone therapy ===
CPA is widely used as an antiandrogen and progestogen in feminizing hormone therapy for transgender individuals. It has been historically used orally at a dosage of 10 to 100 mg/day and by intramuscular injection at a dosage of 300 mg once every 4 weeks. Many transgender individuals seeking feminizing hormone therapy have breast growth as one of the goals for undergoing feminizing hormone therapy, making this particular side effect of CPA generally viewed as a beneficial outcome rather than an issue.

Studies have found that 10, 25, 50, and 100 mg/day CPA in combination with estrogen all result in equivalent and full testosterone suppression in transgender women. In light of risks of CPA such as fatigue, blood clots, benign brain tumors, and liver damage, the use of lower dosages of CPA may help to minimize such risks. As a result, a CPA dosage of 10 mg/day and no greater is now recommended by the World Professional Association for Transgender Health (WPATH) Standards of Care for the Health of Transgender and Gender Diverse People, Version 8 (SOC8).

CPA has an advantage over spironolactone as an antiandrogen in transgender people, as the combination of estrogen and CPA consistently suppresses testosterone levels into the normal female range whereas estrogen with spironolactone does not. Spironolactone is the most widely used antiandrogen in transgender women in the United States, whereas CPA is widely used in Europe and throughout the rest of the world.

Aside from adult transgender people, CPA has also been used as a puberty blocker and hence as an antiandrogen and antiestrogen to suppress puberty in transgender adolescents, although GnRH modulators are primarily used and more effective for this purpose.

=== Prostate cancer ===
CPA is used as an antiandrogen monotherapy and means of androgen deprivation therapy in the palliative treatment of prostate cancer in men. It is used at very high doses by mouth or by intramuscular injection to treat this disease. Antiandrogens do not cure prostate cancer, but can significantly extend life in men with the disease. CPA has similar effectiveness to GnRH modulators and surgical castration, high-dose estrogen therapy (e.g., with diethylstilbestrol), and high-dose nonsteroidal antiandrogen monotherapy (e.g., with bicalutamide), but has significantly inferior effectiveness to combined androgen blockade with a GnRH modulator and a nonsteroidal antiandrogen (e.g., with bicalutamide or enzalutamide). In addition, the combination of CPA with a GnRH modulator or surgical castration has not been found to improve outcomes relative to a GnRH modulator or surgical castration alone, in contrast to nonsteroidal antiandrogens. Due to its inferior effectiveness, tolerability, and safety, CPA is rarely used in the treatment of prostate cancer today, having largely been superseded by GnRH modulators and nonsteroidal antiandrogens. CPA is the only steroidal antiandrogen that continues to be used in the treatment of prostate cancer.

Dose-ranging studies of CPA for prostate cancer were not performed, and the optimal dosage of CPA for the treatment of the condition has not been established. A dosage range of oral CPA of 100 to 300 mg/day is used in the treatment of prostate cancer, but generally 150 to 200 mg/day oral CPA is used. Schröder (1993, 2002) reviewed the issue of CPA dosage and recommended a dosage of 200 to 300 mg/day for CPA as a monotherapy and a dosage of 100 to 200 mg/day for CPA in combined androgen blockade (that is, CPA in combination with surgical or medical castration). However, the combination of CPA with castration for prostate cancer has been found to significantly decrease overall survival compared to castration alone. Hence, the use of CPA as the antiandrogen component in combined androgen blockade would appear not to be advisable. When used by intramuscular injection to treat prostate cancer, CPA is used at a dosage of 300 mg once a week.

The combination of CPA with an estrogen such as ethinylestradiol sulfonate or low-dose diethylstilbestrol has been used as a form of combined androgen blockade and as an alternative to the combination of CPA with surgical or medical castration.

=== Sexual deviance ===
CPA is used as an antiandrogen and form of chemical castration in the treatment of paraphilias and hypersexuality in men. It is used to treat sex offenders. The medication is approved in more than 20 countries for this indication and is predominantly employed in Canada, Europe, and the Middle East. CPA works by decreasing sex drive and sexual arousal and producing sexual dysfunction. CPA can also be used to reduce sex drive in individuals with inappropriate sexual behaviors, such as people with intellectual disability and dementia. The medication is also used to reduce sexual behavior diagnosed as self-harmful, such as masochism. CPA has comparable effectiveness to medroxyprogesterone acetate in suppressing sexual urges and function but appears to be less effective than GnRH modulators like leuprorelin and has more side effects.

High-dose CPA significantly decreases sexual fantasies and sexual activity in 80 to 90% of men with paraphilias. In addition, it has been found to decrease the rate of reoffending in sex offenders from 85% to 6%, with most of the reoffenses being committed by individuals who did not follow their CPA treatment prescription. It has been reported that in 80% of cases, 100 mg/day CPA is adequate to achieve the desired reduction of sexuality, whereas in the remaining 20% of cases, 200 mg/day is sufficient. When only a partial reduction in sexuality is desired, 50 mg/day CPA can be useful. Reduced sexual desire and erectile function occurs with CPA by the end of the first week of treatment, and becomes maximal within three to four weeks. The dosage range is 50 to 300 mg/day.

=== Early puberty ===
CPA is used as an antiandrogen and antiestrogen to treat precocious puberty in boys and girls. However, it is not fully satisfactory for this indication because it is not able to completely suppress puberty. It does not suppress skeletal maturation enough to avoid a reduction in height at adulthood. For this reason, CPA has mostly been superseded by GnRH agonists in the treatment of precocious puberty. CPA is not satisfactory for gonadotropin-independent precocious puberty. CPA has been used at dosages of 50 to 300 mg/m^{2} to treat precocious puberty.

=== Other uses ===
CPA is useful in the treatment of hot flashes, for instance due to androgen deprivation therapy for prostate cancer.

CPA is useful for suppressing the testosterone flare at the initiation of GnRH agonist therapy. It has been used successfully both alone and in combination with estrogens such as diethylstilbestrol for this purpose.

=== Available forms ===
CPA is available in the form of oral tablets alone (higher-dose; 10 mg, 50 mg, 100 mg) or in combination with ethinylestradiol or estradiol valerate (low-dose; 1 or 2 mg CPA) and in the form of ampoules for intramuscular injection (higher-dose; 100 mg/mL, 300 mg/3 mL; brand name Androcur Depot).

The higher-dose formulations are used to treat prostate cancer and certain other androgen-related indications while the low-dose formulations which also have an estrogen are used as combined birth control pills and are used in menopausal hormone therapy for the treatment of menopausal symptoms.

== Contraindications ==
Contraindications of CPA include:

- Hypersensitivity to CPA or any of the other components of the medication
- Pregnancy, lactation, and breastfeeding
- Puberty (except if being used to treat precocious puberty or delay puberty)
- Liver diseases and liver dysfunction
- Chronic kidney disease
- Dubin–Johnson syndrome and Rotor syndrome
- History of jaundice or persistent pruritus during pregnancy
- History of herpes during pregnancy
- Previous or existing liver tumors (only if not due to metastases from prostate cancer)
- Previous or existing meningioma, hyperprolactinemia, or prolactinoma
- Wasting syndromes (except in inoperable prostate cancer)
- Severe depression
- Previous or existing thromboembolic processes, as well as stroke and myocardial infarction
- Severe diabetes with vascular changes
- Sickle-cell anemia

When CPA is used in combination with an estrogen, contraindications for birth control pills should also be considered.

== Side effects ==
CPA is generally well-tolerated and has a mild side-effect profile regardless of dosage when it is used in combination with an estrogen in women. Side effects of CPA in general include hypogonadism (low sex-hormone levels) and associated symptoms such as demasculinization, sexual dysfunction, infertility, and osteoporosis (fragile bones); breast changes such as breast tenderness, breast enlargement, and gynecomastia (breasts in men); emotional changes such as fatigue and depression; and other side effects such as vitamin B12 deficiency, weak glucocorticoid effects, and elevated liver enzymes. Weight gain can occur with CPA when it is used at high doses. Some of the side effects of CPA can be improved or fully prevented if it is combined with an estrogen to prevent estrogen deficiency. Few quantitative data are available on many of the potential side effects of CPA. Pooled tolerability data for CPA is not available in the literature. Cyproterone is also known to suppress adrenocortical function.

At very high doses in aged men with prostate cancer, CPA can cause cardiovascular side effects. Rarely, CPA can produce blood clots, liver toxicity (including hepatitis, liver failure, and liver cancer), excessively high prolactin levels, and certain benign brain tumors including meningiomas (tumors of the meninges) and prolactinomas (prolactin-secreting tumors of the pituitary gland). Upon discontinuation from high doses, CPA can produce adrenal insufficiency as a withdrawal effect.

Side effects of high-dose cyproterone acetate
Frequency	System Organ Class	Side effect
Very common (≥10%)	General disorders and administration site conditions	Headache; Tiredness
Very common (≥10%)	Psychiatric disorders	Decreased libido (men); Erectile dysfunction (men); Reduced ejaculate volume (men)
Very common (≥10%)	Reproductive system and breast disorders	Reversible inhibition of spermatogenesis (men); Inhibition of ovulation and reversible infertility (women)
Very common (≥10%)	Hepatobiliary disorders	Elevated liver enzymes
Common (≥1% and <10%)	Metabolism and nutrition disorders	Weight gain or loss (can be associated with fluid retention)
Common (≥1% and <10%)	Psychiatric disorders	Depressed mood; Restlessness
Common (≥1% and <10%)	Reproductive system and breast disorders	Gynecomastia (men); Breast pain/tenderness; Irregular menstruation
Common (≥1% and <10%)	General disorders and administration site conditions	Fatigue; Hot flashes; Sweating
Common (≥1% and <10%)	Respiratory, thoracic, and mediastinal disorders	Shortness of breath
Common (≥1% and <10%)	Gastrointestinal disorders	Nausea; Gastrointestinal complaints
Uncommon (≥0.1% and <1%)	Psychiatric disorders	Decreased libido (women)
Uncommon (≥0.1% and <1%)	Skin and subcutaneous tissue disorders	Rash
Rare (≥0.01% and <0.1%)	Immune system disorders	Hypersensitivity reactions (rash, itching, shortness of breath)
Rare (≥0.01% and <0.1%)	Psychiatric disorders	Increased libido (women)
Very rare (<0.01%)	Neoplasms benign and malignant	Benign and malignant liver tumors
Very rare (<0.01%)	Musculoskeletal and connective tissue disorders	Osteoporosis
Very rare (<0.01%)	Cardiovascular disorders	Thromboembolic events; Tachycardia
Very rare (<0.01%)	Reproductive system and breast disorders	Galactorrhea
Very rare (<0.01%)	General disorders and administration site conditions	Sleep disturbances
Unspecified	Unsorted	Anemia; Meningioma; Hyperprolactinemia; Prolactinoma; Intra-abdominal hemorrhage; Breast tension; Menstrual spotting; Low Dysmenorrhea Vaginal discharge Skin discoloration Stretch marks Rare Liver toxicity (including jaundice, hepatitis, liver failure)
Notes: Side effects are for dosages of cyproterone acetate (Androcur) of 10 to 300 mg/day. Sources: See template.

== Overdose ==
CPA is relatively safe in acute overdose. It is used at very high doses of up to 300 mg/day by mouth and 700 mg per week by intramuscular injection. For comparison, the dose of CPA used in birth control pills is 2 mg/day. There have been no deaths associated with CPA overdose. There are no specific antidotes for CPA overdose, and treatment should be symptom-based. Gastric lavage can be used in the event of oral overdose within the last 2 to 3 hours.

== Interactions ==
Inhibitors and inducers of the cytochrome P450 enzyme CYP3A4 may interact with CPA. Examples of strong CYP3A4 inhibitors include ketoconazole, itraconazole, clotrimazole, and ritonavir, while examples of strong CYP3A4 inducers include rifampicin, rifampin, phenytoin, carbamazepine, phenobarbital, and St. John's wort. Certain anticonvulsant medications can substantially reduce levels of CPA, by as much as 8-fold.

== Pharmacology ==
=== Pharmacodynamics ===
CPA has antiandrogenic activity, progestogenic activity, weak partial glucocorticoid activity, weak steroidogenesis inhibitor activity, and agonist activity at the pregnane X receptor. It has no estrogenic or antimineralocorticoid activity. In terms of potency, CPA is described as a highly potent progestogen, a moderately potent antiandrogen, and a weak glucocorticoid. Due to its progestogenic activity, CPA has antigonadotropic effects, and is able to suppress fertility and sex-hormone levels in both males and females.

=== Pharmacokinetics ===
CPA can be taken by mouth or by injection into muscle. It has near-complete oral bioavailability, is highly and exclusively bound to albumin in terms of plasma protein binding, is metabolized in the liver by hydroxylation and conjugation, has 15β-hydroxycyproterone acetate (15β-OH-CPA) as a single major active metabolite, has a long elimination half-life of about 2 to 4 days regardless of route of administration, and is excreted in feces primarily and to a lesser extent in urine.

== Chemistry ==
CPA, also known as 1α,2α-methylene-6-chloro-17α-acetoxy-δ^{6}-progesterone or as 1α,2α-methylene-6-chloro-17α-hydroxypregna-4,6-diene-3,20-dione acetate, is a synthetic pregnane steroid and an acetylated derivative of 17α-hydroxyprogesterone. It is structurally related to other 17α-hydroxyprogesterone derivatives such as chlormadinone acetate, hydroxyprogesterone caproate, medroxyprogesterone acetate, and megestrol acetate.

=== Synthesis ===
Chemical syntheses of CPA have been published. The following is one such synthesis:

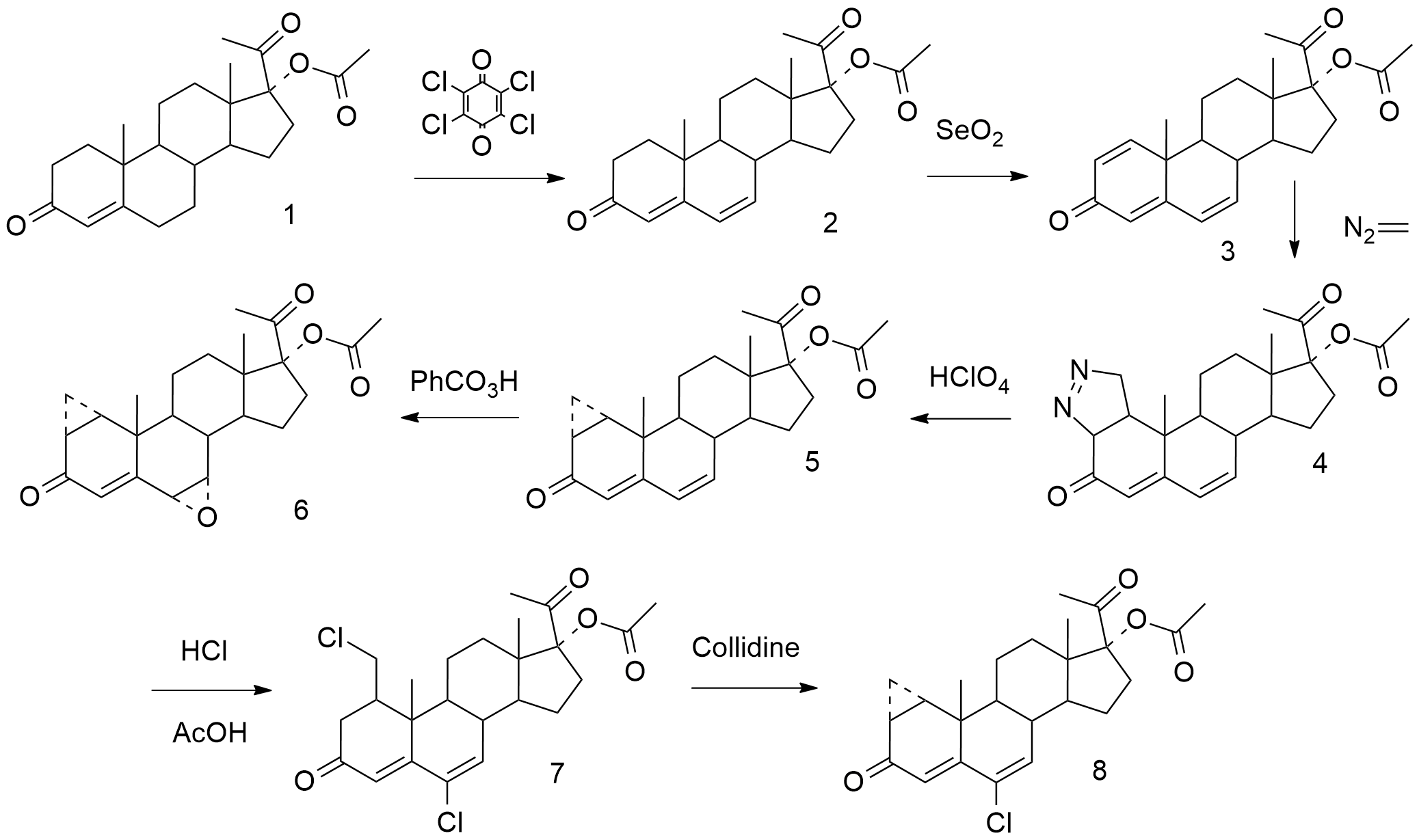
Thieme Partial synthesis of CPA, using hydroxyprogesterone acetate as a starting material, by Wiechert & Neumann (1965) and Wiechert (1966)

The dehydrogenation of 17α-hydroxyprogesterone acetate [302-23-8] (1) with chloranil (tetrachloro-p-benzoquinone) gives a compound that has been called melengestrol acetate [425-51-4] (2). Dehydrogenation with selenium dioxide gives 17-acetoxy-1,4,6-pregnatriene-3,20-dione [2668-75-9] (3). Reacting this with diazomethane results in a 1,3-dipolar addition reaction at C1–C2 of the double bond of the steroid system, which forms a derivative of dihydropyrazole, CID:134990386 (4). This compound cleaves when reacted with perchloric acid, releasing nitrogen molecules and forming a cyclopropane derivative, 6-deschloro cyproterone acetate [2701-50-0] (5). Selective oxidation of the C6=C7 olefin with benzoyl peroxide gives the epoxide, i.e. 6-deschloro-6,7-epoxy cyproterone [15423-97-9] (6). The penultimate step involves a reaction with hydrochloric acid in acetic acid, resulting in the formation of chlorine and its subsequent dehydration, and a simultaneous opening of the cyclopropane ring giving 1α-(chloromethyl) chlormadinone acetate [17183-98-1] (7). The heating of this in collidine reforms the cyclopropane ring, completing the synthesis of CPA (8).

== History ==
CPA was first synthesized in 1961 by Rudolf Wiechert, a Schering employee, and together with Friedmund Neumann in Berlin, they filed for a patent for CPA as "progestational agent" in 1962. The antiandrogenic activity of CPA was discovered serendipitously by Hamada, Neumann, and Karl Junkmann in 1963. Along with the steroidal antiandrogens benorterone (17α-methyl-B-nortestosterone; SKF-7690), cyproterone, BOMT (Ro 7–2340), and trimethyltrienolone (R-2956) and the nonsteroidal antiandrogens flutamide and DIMP (Ro 7–8117), CPA was one of the first antiandrogens to be discovered and researched.

CPA was initially developed as a progestogen for the prevention of threatened abortion. As part of its development, it was assessed for androgenic activity to ensure that it would not produce teratogenic effects in female fetuses. The drug was administered to pregnant rats and its effects on the rat fetuses were studied. To the surprise of the researchers, all of the rat pups born appeared to be female. After 20 female rat pups in a row had been counted, it was clear that this could not be a chance occurrence. The rat pups were further evaluated and it was found that, in terms of karyotype, about 50% were actually males. The male rat pups had been feminized, and this resultant finding constituted the discovery of the powerful antiandrogenic activity of CPA. A year after patent approval in 1965, Neumann published additional evidence of CPA's antiandrogenic effect in rats; he reported an "organizational effect of CPA on the brain". CPA started being used in animal experiments around the world to investigate how antiandrogens affected fetal sexual differentiation.

The first clinical use of CPA in the treatment of sexual deviance and prostate cancer occurred in 1966. It was first studied in the treatment of androgen-dependent skin and hair symptoms, specifically acne, hirsutism, seborrhea, and scalp hair loss, in 1969. CPA was first approved for medical use in 1973 in Europe under the brand name Androcur. In 1977, a formulation of CPA was introduced for use by intramuscular injection. CPA was first marketed as a birth control pill in 1978 in combination with ethinylestradiol under the brand name Diane. Following phase III clinical trials, CPA was approved for the treatment of prostate cancer in Germany in 1980. CPA became available in Canada as Androcur in 1987, as Androcur Depot in 1990, and as Diane-35 in 1998. Conversely, CPA was never introduced in any form in the United States. This was reportedly due to concerns about breast tumors observed with high-dose pregnane progestogens in beagle dogs as well as concerns about potential teratogenicity in pregnant women. Use of CPA in transgender women, an off-label indication, was reported as early as 1977. The use of CPA in transgender women was well-established by the early 1990s.

The history of CPA, including its discovery, development, and marketing, has been reviewed.

== Society and culture ==
=== Generic names ===
The English and generic name of CPA is cyproterone acetate and this is its USAN, BAN, and JAN. The English and generic name of unacetylated cyproterone is cyproterone and this is its INN and BAN, while cyprotérone is the DCF and French name and ciproterone is the DCIT and Italian name. The name of unesterified cyproterone in Latin is cyproteronum, in German is cyproteron, and in Spanish is ciproterona. These names of cyproterone correspond for CPA to acétate de cyprotérone in French, acetato de ciproterona in Spanish, ciproterone acetato in Italian, cyproteronacetat in German, siproteron asetat in Turkish, and cyproteronacetaat in Dutch. CPA is also known by the developmental code names SH-80714 and SH-714, while unacetylated cyproterone is known by the developmental code names SH-80881 and SH-881.

=== Brand names ===
CPA is marketed under brand names including Androcur, Androcur Depot, Androcur-100, Androstat, Asoteron, Cyprone, Cyproplex, Cyprostat, Cysaxal, Imvel, and Siterone. When CPA is formulated in combination with ethinylestradiol, it is also known as co-cyprindiol, and brand names for this formulation include Andro-Diane, Bella HEXAL 35, Chloe, Cypretil, Cypretyl, Cyproderm, Diane, Diane Mite, Diane-35, Dianette, Dixi 35, Drina, Elleacnelle, Estelle, Estelle-35, Ginette, Linface, Minerva, Vreya, and Zyrona. CPA is also marketed in combination with estradiol valerate as Climen, Climene, Elamax, and Femilar.

=== Availability ===
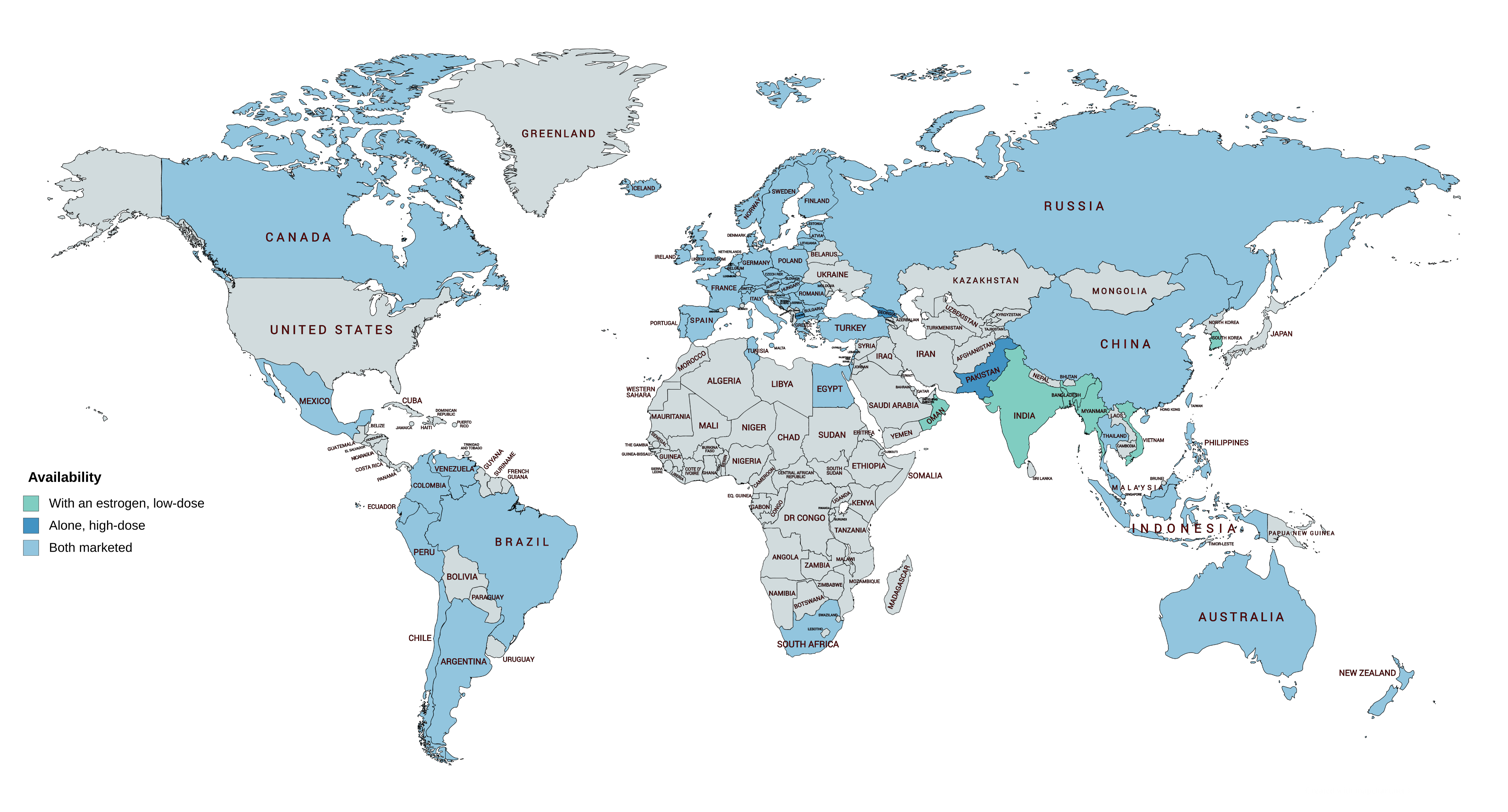
Availability of CPA in countries throughout the world (as of March 2018). Turquoise is combined with an estrogen at a low dose, dark blue is alone at a high dose, and light blue is both available.

CPA is widely available throughout the world, and is marketed in almost every developed country, with the notable major exceptions of the United States and Japan. In almost all countries in which CPA is marketed, it is available both alone and in combination with an estrogen in birth control pills. CPA is marketed widely in combination with both ethinylestradiol and estradiol valerate. CPA-containing birth control pills are available in South Korea, but CPA as a standalone medication is not marketed in this country. In Japan and South Korea, the closely related antiandrogen and progestin chlormadinone acetate, as well as other medications, are used instead of CPA. Specific places in which CPA is marketed include the United Kingdom, elsewhere throughout Europe, Canada, Australia, New Zealand, South Africa, Latin America, and Asia. CPA is not marketed in most of Africa and the Middle East.

It has been said that the lack of availability of CPA in the United States explains why there are relatively few studies of it in the treatment of androgen-dependent conditions such as hyperandrogenism and hirsutism in women.

=== Generation ===
Progestins in birth control pills are sometimes grouped by generation. While the 19-nortestosterone progestins are consistently grouped into generations, the pregnane progestins that are or have been used in birth control pills are typically omitted from such classifications or are grouped simply as "miscellaneous" or "pregnanes". In any case, CPA has been described as a "first-generation" progestin similarly to closely related progestins like chlormadinone acetate, medroxyprogesterone acetate, and megestrol acetate.

== Research ==
CPA has been studied and used in combination with low-dose diethylstilbestrol in the treatment of prostate cancer. The combination results in suppression of testosterone levels into the castrate range, which normally cannot be achieved with CPA alone. CPA has been studied as a form of androgen deprivation therapy for the treatment of benign prostatic hyperplasia (enlarged prostate). The medication has been studied in the treatment of breast cancer as well.

CPA has been studied for use as a potential male hormonal contraceptive both alone and in combination with testosterone in men. CPA was under development by Barr Pharmaceuticals in the 2000s for the treatment of hot flashes in prostate cancer patients in the United States. It reached phase III clinical trials for this indication and had the tentative brand name CyPat but development was ultimately discontinued in 2008. CPA is not satisfactorily effective as topical antiandrogen, for instance in the treatment of acne. CPA has been used to treat estrogen hypersensitivity vulvovaginitis in women.

CPA has been investigated for use in reducing aggression and self-injurious behavior via its antiandrogenic effects in conditions like autism spectrum disorders, dementias like Alzheimer's disease, and psychosis. CPA may be effective in the treatment of obsessive–compulsive disorder (OCD). CPA has been studied in the treatment of cluster headaches in men.

== See also ==
- Androgen suppression
- Estradiol valerate/cyproterone acetate
- Ethinylestradiol/cyproterone acetate
- Pharmacology of cyproterone acetate
