= 5N-Bicalutamide =

Chemical compound

Clinical data
- Other names: 5-Azabicalutamide
- Drug class: Nonsteroidal antiandrogen
- ATC code: None

Identifiers
- IUPAC name: N-[6-cyano-5-(trifluoromethyl)pyridin-3-yl]-3-(4-fluorophenyl)sulfonyl-2-hydroxy-2-methylpropanamide
- CAS Number: 1845688-96-1
- PubChem CID: 118614933
- ChemSpider: 88295757
- UNII: 5SNH85A34V

Chemical and physical data
- Formula: C_{17}H_{13}F_{4}N_{3}O_{4}S
- Molar mass: 431.36 g·mol^{−1}
- 3D model (JSmol): Interactive image
- SMILES: CC(CS(=O)(=O)C1=CC=C(C=C1)F)(C(=O)NC2=CN=C(C(=C2)C(F)(F)F)C#N)O
- InChI: InChI=1S/C17H13F4N3O4S/c1-16(26,9-29(27,28)12-4-2-10(18)3-5-12)15(25)24-11-6-13(17(19,20)21)14(7-22)23-8-11/h2-6,8,26H,9H2,1H3,(H,24,25); Key:JWQMHMGGGRQTSY-UHFFFAOYSA-N

5N-Bicalutamide, or 5-azabicalutamide, is a highly potent nonsteroidal antiandrogen (NSAA) which was discovered in 2016. It is a structural modification of bicalutamide, differing from it only by the replacement of a carbon atom with a nitrogen atom in one of its phenyl rings. Similarly to bicalutamide, the drug acts as a selective antagonist of the androgen receptor (AR). However, unlike bicalutamide, it is a reversible covalent antagonist and stays bound to the receptor for a far longer amount of time. As a result of this difference, 5N-bicalutamide has markedly improved potency relative to bicalutamide, with approximately 150-fold higher affinity for the AR (K_{i} = 0.15 nM versus 22.3 nM) and about 20-fold greater functional inhibition (IC_{50} = 15 nM versus 310 nM) of the AR. Future studies of 5N-bicalutamide in normal and mutated prostate cancer cells are planned or underway and it is anticipated that N-bicalutamide may be able to overcome resistance to current antiandrogens that are used in the treatment of prostate cancer.

Enzalutamide and related second-generation NSAAs like RD-162 and apalutamide were derived from bicalutamide and as a result are similar to it in chemical structure. They have up to about 10-fold higher affinity for the AR than does bicalutamide and hence are comparatively more potent and efficacious antiandrogens. However, their structures are rigidified such that the analogous structural modification that was done with bicalutamide to create 5N-bicalutamide could not be used to increase affinity or potency with them. Enzalutamide was described in 2013 as "the emperor of all antiandrogens" and other second-generation NSAAs have similar potency to it, so 5N-bicalutamide would appear to be among the most potent AR antagonists to have been developed thus far.

== See also ==
- Cyanonilutamide
- N-Terminal domain antiandrogen
