= Tulmimetostat =

Investigational antineoplastic drug

Clinical data
- Other names: CPI-0209, DZR123
- Routes of administration: Oral
- Drug class: EZH2/EZH1 inhibitor

Legal status
- Legal status: Investigational

Identifiers
- IUPAC name: (2R)-7-chloro-2-[4-(3-methoxyazetidin-1-yl)cyclohexyl]-2,4-dimethyl-N-[(6-methyl-4-methylsulfanyl-2-oxo-1H-pyridin-3-yl)methyl]-1,3-benzodioxole-5-carboxamide
- CAS Number: 2567686-02-4
- PubChem CID: 155590998
- DrugBank: DB19446
- ChemSpider: 115010435
- UNII: OUQ4N85Z0B
- KEGG: D12602
- ChEMBL: ChEMBL5095231

Chemical and physical data
- Formula: C_{28}H_{36}ClN_{3}O_{5}S
- Molar mass: 562.12 g·mol^{−1}
- 3D model (JSmol): Interactive image
- SMILES: CC1=CC(=C(C(=O)N1)CNC(=O)C2=CC(=C3C(=C2C)O[C@@](O3)(C)C4CCC(CC4)N5CC(C5)OC)Cl)SC
- InChI: InChI=1S/C28H36ClN3O5S/c1-15-10-23(38-5)21(27(34)31-15)12-30-26(33)20-11-22(29)25-24(16(20)2)36-28(3,37-25)17-6-8-18(9-7-17)32-13-19(14-32)35-4/h10-11,17-19H,6-9,12-14H2,1-5H3,(H,30,33)(H,31,34)/t17?,18?,28-/m1/s1; Key:CAAWBLRXQXMGHV-WOLMIXIISA-N

Tulmimetostat (also known as CPI-0209 or DZR123) is an orally available, investigational antineoplastic drug being developed for the treatment of various advanced solid tumors and lymphomas that is being developed by MorphoSys.

Tulmimetostat functions as a dual inhibitor of the histone methyltransferases EZH2 and EZH1, which are key components of the polycomb repressive complex 2 (PRC2). PRC2 plays a critical role in gene silencing and is implicated in cancer progression.

== Mechanism of action ==
Tulmimetostat exerts its therapeutic effect by inhibiting the activity of EZH2 and EZH1. EZH2 is the catalytic subunit of the Polycomb repressive complex 2 (PRC2), a crucial epigenetic regulator of gene expression. In numerous cancers, EZH2 is overexpressed or mutated, leading to an increase in the methylation of histone H3 on lysine 27 (H3K27). This methylation promotes gene silencing, including that of tumor suppressor genes, thereby contributing to uncontrolled cancer cell proliferation, metastasis, and resistance to established therapies.

By inhibiting EZH2, tulmimetostat aims to prevent this aberrant methylation, thereby altering gene expression patterns associated with cancer pathways and reducing the proliferation of EZH2-expressing cancer cells. The dual inhibition of both EZH2 and EZH1 is a design feature intended to overcome potential compensatory functions of EZH1 that might limit the efficacy of first-generation EZH2 inhibitors in some cancer types.

== Clinical development ==
Tulmimetostat is currently undergoing investigation in Phase 1 and Phase 2 clinical trials for various advanced solid tumors and lymphomas.

It has received Fast Track Designation from the FDA for the treatment of advanced, recurrent, or metastatic endometrial cancer with ARID1A mutations, particularly in patients whose disease has progressed on frontline treatment.

Clinical trials are exploring tulmimetostat as a monotherapy and in combination with other treatments. These include combinations with enzalutamide for castration-resistant prostate cancer and with PD-1 blockade for non-small cell lung cancer.

=== Key indications under investigation ===
- Advanced solid tumors
- Lymphomas (e.g., diffuse large B-cell lymphoma, T-cell lymphoma, mycosis fungoides, Sézary syndrome)
- Endometrial cancer (especially ARID1A-mutated)
- Ovarian clear cell carcinoma (ARID1A-mutated)
- Mesothelioma (BAP1-mutated)
- Prostate cancer (androgen receptor-dependent)
- Urothelial carcinoma

Preliminary results from clinical trials have demonstrated antitumor activity and disease stabilization in heavily pretreated patients across multiple tumor types. The safety profile has been generally consistent with the mechanism of EZH2 inhibition, with common adverse events including thrombocytopenia, diarrhea, nausea, and anemia.
