= C21H27ClO5 =

The molecular formula C_{21}H_{27}ClO_{5} may refer to:

- EPI-001, the first inhibitor of the androgen receptor amino-terminal domain
- Ralaniten (EPI-002), an N-terminal domain antiandrogen which was never marketed
