= Epsametostat =

Clinical data
- Other names: HH2853

Identifiers
- IUPAC name: N-[(4-methoxy-6-methyl-2-oxo-1H-pyridin-3-yl)methyl]-6-methyl-1-(6-methylpyridazin-3-yl)-5-[(1R)-1-[4-(2,2,2-trifluoroethyl)piperazin-1-yl]ethyl]indolizine-7-carboxamide
- CAS Number: 2202678-06-4
- PubChem CID: 134340937
- ChemSpider: 115010245
- UNII: P8U5JF6NBY

Chemical and physical data
- Formula: C_{31}H_{36}F_{3}N_{7}O_{3}
- Molar mass: 611.670 g·mol^{−1}
- 3D model (JSmol): Interactive image
- SMILES: CC1=NN=C(C=C1)C2=C3C=C(C(=C(N3C=C2)[C@@H](C)N4CCN(CC4)CC(F)(F)F)C)C(=O)NCC5=C(C=C(NC5=O)C)OC
- InChI: InChI=InChI=1S/C31H36F3N7O3/c1-18-6-7-25(38-37-18)22-8-9-41-26(22)15-23(29(42)35-16-24-27(44-5)14-19(2)36-30(24)43)20(3)28(41)21(4)40-12-10-39(11-13-40)17-31(32,33)34/h6-9,14-15,21H,10-13,16-17H2,1-5H3,(H,35,42)(H,36,43)/t21-/m1/s1; Key:BIABSPVTTUDBEO-OAQYLSRUSA-N

Epsametostat is an investigational new drug that is being evaluated for the treatment of peripheral T-cell lymphoma. It is a EZH1/EZH2 inhibitor developed by Shanghai Haihe Pharmaceutical Research & Development Co., Ltd.
