= Ketodarolutamide =

Chemical compound

Clinical data
- Other names: ORM-15341; BAY-1896953
- Drug class: Nonsteroidal antiandrogen

Pharmacokinetic data
- Elimination half-life: 10.0 hours

Identifiers
- IUPAC name: 3-acetyl-N-[(2S)-1-[3-(3-chloro-4-cyanophenyl)pyrazol-1-yl]propan-2-yl]-1H-pyrazole-5-carboxamide
- CAS Number: 1297537-33-7
- PubChem CID: 52919826
- ChemSpider: 38772344
- UNII: 9EPS75QMTL
- CompTox Dashboard (EPA): DTXSID101111196
- ECHA InfoCard: 100.235.511

Chemical and physical data
- Formula: C_{19}H_{17}ClN_{6}O_{2}
- Molar mass: 396.84 g·mol^{−1}
- 3D model (JSmol): Interactive image
- SMILES: C[C@@H](CN1C=CC(=N1)C2=CC(=C(C=C2)C#N)Cl)NC(=O)C3=CC(=NN3)C(=O)C
- InChI: InChI=1S/C19H17ClN6O2/c1-11(22-19(28)18-8-17(12(2)27)23-24-18)10-26-6-5-16(25-26)13-3-4-14(9-21)15(20)7-13/h3-8,11H,10H2,1-2H3,(H,22,28)(H,23,24)/t11-/m0/s1; Key:GMBPVBVTPBWIKC-NSHDSACASA-N

Ketodarolutamide (developmental code names ORM-15341, BAY-1896953) is a nonsteroidal antiandrogen (NSAA) and the major active metabolite of darolutamide (ODM-201, BAY-1841788), an NSAA which is used in the treatment of prostate cancer in men. Similarly to its parent compound, ketodarolutamide acts as a highly selective, high-affinity, competitive silent antagonist of the androgen receptor (AR). Both agents show much higher affinity and more potent inhibition of the AR relative to the other NSAAs enzalutamide and apalutamide, although they also possess much shorter and comparatively less favorable elimination half-lives. They have also been found not to activate certain mutant AR variants that enzalutamide and apalutamide do activate. Both darolutamide and ketodarolutamide show limited central nervous system distribution, indicating peripheral selectivity, and little or no inhibition or induction of cytochrome P450 enzymes such as CYP3A4, unlike enzalutamide and apalutamide.
