= RU-57073 =

Chemical compound

Clinical data
- Drug class: Nonsteroidal antiandrogen

Identifiers
- IUPAC name: 4-[3-(2-Hydroxyethyl)-4,4-dimethyl-5-oxo-2-sulfanylideneimidazolidin-1-yl]-2-(trifluoromethyl)benzonitrile
- CAS Number: 143782-37-0
- PubChem CID: 21884237
- UNII: T5WKD9ULR6
- CompTox Dashboard (EPA): DTXSID201114393

Chemical and physical data
- Formula: C_{15}H_{14}F_{3}N_{3}O_{2}S
- Molar mass: 357.35 g·mol^{−1}
- 3D model (JSmol): Interactive image
- SMILES: CC1(C(=O)N(C(=S)N1CCO)C2=CC(=C(C=C2)C#N)C(F)(F)F)C
- InChI: InChI=1S/C15H14F3N3O2S/c1-14(2)12(23)21(13(24)20(14)5-6-22)10-4-3-9(8-19)11(7-10)15(16,17)18/h3-4,7,22H,5-6H2,1-2H3; Key:HNTMVNIRYPJDDJ-UHFFFAOYSA-N

RU-57073 is a nonsteroidal antiandrogen which was never marketed. It shows 163% of the affinity of testosterone for the androgen receptor and negligible affinity for other steroid hormone receptors.

== See also ==
- Cyanonilutamide
- Nilutamide
- RU-56187
- RU-58642
- RU-58841
- RU-59063
