= Ralaniten acetate =

Chemical compound

Clinical data
- Other names: EPI-506
- Routes of administration: By mouth
- Drug class: Nonsteroidal antiandrogen

Identifiers
- IUPAC name: (2S)-3-[4-(2-[4-[(2S)-2-(Acetyloxy)-3-chloropropoxy]phenyl]propan-2-yl)phenoxy]propane-1,2-diyl diacetate
- CAS Number: 1637573-04-6
- UNII: L10K286T2H
- KEGG: D11185

Chemical and physical data
- Formula: C_{27}H_{33}ClO_{8}
- Molar mass: 521.00 g·mol^{−1}

Ralaniten acetate (developmental code name EPI-506) is a first-in-class antiandrogen that targets the N-terminal domain (NTD) of the androgen receptor (AR) developed by ESSA Pharmaceuticals and was under investigation for the treatment of prostate cancer. This mechanism of action is believed to allow the drug to block signaling from the AR and its splice variants. EPI-506 is a derivative of bisphenol A and a prodrug of ralaniten (EPI-002), one of the four stereoisomers of EPI-001, and was developed as a successor of EPI-001. The drug reached phase I/II prior to the discontinuation of its development. It showed signs of efficacy in the form of prostatic specific antigen (PSA) decreases (4–29%) predominantly at higher doses (≥1,280 mg) in some patients but also caused side effects and was discontinued by its developer in favor of next-generation AR NTD inhibitors with improved potency and tolerability.

== See also ==
- Masofaniten
- N-Terminal domain antiandrogen
