= Darolutamide =

Chemical compound

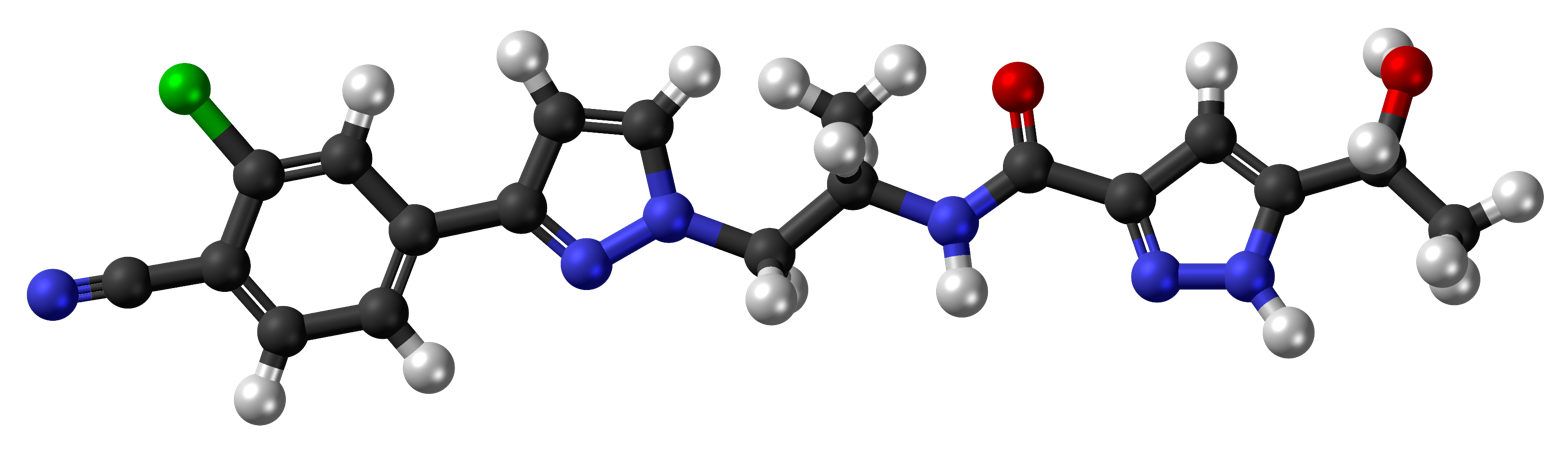

Clinical data
- Trade names: Nubeqa
- Other names: Darramamide, ODM-201, BAY-1841788
- AHFS/Drugs.com: Monograph
- MedlinePlus: a619045
- License data: EU EMA: by INN; US DailyMed: Darolutamide
- Pregnancy category: AU: X (High risk)
- Routes of administration: By mouth
- Drug class: Nonsteroidal antiandrogen
- ATC code: L02BB06 (WHO)

Legal status
- Legal status: AU: S4 (Prescription only); CA: ℞-only; US: ℞-only; EU: Rx-only

Pharmacokinetic data
- Bioavailability: ≤30%
- Protein binding: Darolutamide: 92% Ketodarolutamide: 99.8%
- Metabolism: Dehydrogenation (CYP3A4), glucuronidation (UGT1A9, UGT1A1)
- Metabolites: Ketodarolutamide
- Elimination half-life: 16–20 hours
- Excretion: Urine: 63.4% Feces: 32.4%

Identifiers
- IUPAC name: N-((S)-1-(3-(3-Chloro-4-cyanophenyl)-1H-pyrazol-1-yl)propan-2-yl)-5-(1-hydroxyethyl)-1H-pyrazole-3-carboxamide
- CAS Number: 1297538-32-9
- PubChem CID: 67171867
- DrugBank: DB12941
- ChemSpider: 38772320
- UNII: X05U0N2RCO
- KEGG: D11045
- ChEBI: CHEBI:747353
- ChEMBL: ChEMBL4297185
- CompTox Dashboard (EPA): DTXSID101027953
- ECHA InfoCard: 100.264.885

Chemical and physical data
- Formula: C_{19}H_{19}ClN_{6}O_{2}
- Molar mass: 398.85 g·mol^{−1}
- 3D model (JSmol): Interactive image
- SMILES: C[C@@H](Cn1ccc(n1)c2ccc(c(c2)Cl)C#N)NC(=O)c3cc([nH]n3)C(C)O
- InChI: InChI=1S/C19H19ClN6O2/c1-11(22-19(28)18-8-17(12(2)27)23-24-18)10-26-6-5-16(25-26)13-3-4-14(9-21)15(20)7-13/h3-8,11-12,27H,10H2,1-2H3,(H,22,28)(H,23,24)/t11-,12?/m0/s1; Key:BLIJXOOIHRSQRB-PXYINDEMSA-N

Darolutamide, sold under the brand name Nubeqa, is an antiandrogen medication which is used in the treatment of non-metastatic castration-resistant prostate cancer (nmCRPC) in men. It is specifically approved to treat nmCRPC in conjunction with surgical or medical castration. The medication is taken by mouth twice per day with food.

Side effects of darolutamide added to castration may include fatigue, asthenia, pain in the arms and legs, and rash. Darolutamide is a nonsteroidal antiandrogen (NSAA), and acts as a selective antagonist of the androgen receptor (AR). It has been referred to as a second- or third-generation NSAA.

Darolutamide was patented in 2011 and was approved for medical use in USA in July 2019, in the European Union in March 2020 in Australia in July 2020. and in Canada in 2020,

== Medical uses ==
Darolutamide is approved for use concurrently with a gonadotropin-releasing hormone (GnRH) agonist or antagonist or bilateral orchiectomy in the treatment of non-metastatic castration-resistant prostate cancer (nmCRPC) in men. It is used at a dosage of 600 mg orally twice per day (1,200 mg/day total) with food. In individuals with severe renal impairment or moderate hepatic impairment, darolutamide is used at a dosage of 300 mg orally twice per day (600 mg/day total) with food. No dosage adjustment is needed for mild to moderate renal impairment or mild hepatic impairment, whereas appropriate dosage adjustment for end-stage kidney disease and severe hepatic impairment is unknown.

Two 2020 meta-analyses reported that enzalutamide and apalutamide seemed to be more effective than darolutamide in improving metastasis-free survival (MFS), however 2021 matched adjusted indirect comparison showed no significant differences between drugs in terms of MFS. According to 2021 meta-analysis darolutamide was ranked first in terms of improving overall survival (OS). Also, darolutamide showed significantly lower rate of grade 3-5 adverse events (AE) compared to both enzalutamide and apalutamide.

=== Available forms ===
Darolutamide is provided in the form of 300 mg oral film-coated tablets.

== Contraindications ==
Darolutamide has no contraindications in men. However, the medication may have teratogenic effects in male fetuses due to its antiandrogenic effects and hence should not be used by women who are pregnant.

== Side effects ==
The most common side effects of darolutamide in clinical trials (≥2% incidence) in castrated men included fatigue and asthenia (16% vs. 11% for placebo), pain in extremities (6% vs. 3% for placebo), and rash (3% vs. 1% for placebo). Darolutamide was also associated with higher incidences of ischemic heart disease (4.0% vs. 3.4% for placebo) and heart failure (2.1% vs. 0.9% for placebo). In terms of laboratory test abnormalities, darolutamide was associated with decreased neutrophil count (20% vs. 9% for placebo), increased aspartate aminotransferase (AST) (23% vs. 14% for placebo; Grade 3–4: 0.5% vs. 0.2% for placebo), and increased bilirubin (16% vs. 7% for placebo). In the clinical studies, 88% of patients treated with darolutamide were age 65 years or older.

No seizures have been observed with darolutamide in clinical trials. Darolutamide is an expected teratogen and has a theoretical risk of birth defects in male infants if taken by women during pregnancy. It may impair male fertility. When used as a monotherapy (i.e., without surgical or medical castration) in men, NSAAs are known to produce feminizing breast changes including breast tenderness and gynecomastia.

== Overdose ==
Darolutamide has been studied at a dosage of up to 1,800 mg/day in clinical trials. There were no dose-limiting toxicities seen at this dosage. Due to its saturable absorption and lack of acute toxicity, overdose of darolutamide is not expected to result in systemic toxicity in people with intact hepatic and renal function. There is no specific antidote for overdose of darolutamide. In the event of darolutamide overdose, if there is no toxicity, treatment can be continued as normal. If there is suspicion of toxicity, general supportive measures should be undertaken until clinical toxicity has decreased or resolved and then treatment may be continued.

== Interactions ==
Combined P-glycoprotein and strong or moderate CYP3A4 inducers such as rifampicin may decrease blood levels of darolutamide, while combined P-glycoprotein and strong CYP3A4 inhibitors such as itraconazole may increase blood levels of darolutamide. Darolutamide is an inhibitor of the breast cancer resistance protein (BCRP) transporter and can increase blood levels of substrates for BCRP protein, such as rosuvastatin, by approximately 5-fold.

== Pharmacology ==
=== Pharmacodynamics ===
Darolutamide is a second- or third-generation nonsteroidal antiandrogen (NSAA). It acts as a selective competitive silent antagonist of the androgen receptor (AR), the biological target of androgens like testosterone and dihydrotestosterone (DHT). Its affinity (K_{i}) for the AR is 11 nM and its functional inhibition (IC_{50}) of the AR is 26 nM. The major metabolite of darolutamide, ketodarolutamide, has similar antiandrogenic activity relative to darolutamide (K_{i} = 8 nM; IC_{50} = 38 nM). In addition to its actions as an AR antagonist, darolutamide has been found to act as a silent antagonist of the progesterone receptor (PR), with approximately 1% of the potency of its AR antagonism.

A dosage of darolutamide of 1,200 mg/day has been found to result in a mean decrease in prostate specific antigen (PSA) levels of more than 90% in men with prostate cancer. The addition of darolutamide to castration has been found to decrease PSA levels by more than 50% in about 50% of men at 200 mg/day, 69% of men at 400 mg/day, 83% of men at 1,200 mg/day, and 86% of men at 1,400 mg/day. In accordance with its antiandrogenic activity, darolutamide monotherapy (600 mg b.i.d.) has been found to increase testosterone levels in men with prostate cancer by 43.3% on average (range 5.7 to 144.0%), from median 413 ng/dL (range 209–1183 ng/dL) at baseline to median 595 ng/dL (range 260–1500 ng/dL), after 24 weeks of treatment. For comparison, testosterone levels increased by 114.3% with enzalutamide monotherapy and high-dose bicalutamide monotherapy increases testosterone levels by about 59 to 97% in men with prostate cancer. A phase 2 clinical trial directly comparing testosterone increases with darolutamide monotherapy versus enzalutamide monotherapy is underway as of January 2024.

Darolutamide shows some advantages in comparison to enzalutamide and apalutamide, two other second-generation NSAAs. It has been claimed to negligibly cross the blood–brain barrier, and hence is thought to have a reduced risk of seizures and other central side effects from off-target GABA_{A} receptor inhibition. However, darolutamide monotherapy has subsequently been found to increase testosterone levels, a centrally mediated antiandrogenic action. Darolutamide has been found to block the activity of all tested/well-known mutant ARs in prostate cancer, including the recently identified clinically-relevant F876L mutation that produces resistance to enzalutamide and apalutamide. The medication shows higher affinity and inhibitory potency at the AR relative to enzalutamide and apalutamide in vitro (K_{i} = 11 nM relative to 86 nM for enzalutamide and 93 nM for apalutamide; IC_{50} = 26 nM relative to 219 nM for enzalutamide and 200 nM for apalutamide).

Darolutamide inhibits the organic anion transporting polypeptide (OATP) transporters OATP1B1 and OATP1B3 in vitro. It shows no inhibition or induction of cytochrome P450 enzymes (CYP1A2, 2A6, 2B6, 2C8, 2C9, 2C19, 2D6, 2E1, 3A4) at clinically relevant concentrations. Similarly, darolutamide shows no inhibition of a variety of other transporters (P-glycoprotein, MRP2, BSEP, OATs, OCTs, MATEs, OATP2B1, NTCP) at therapeutic concentrations.

=== Pharmacokinetics ===
==== Absorption ====
The absolute bioavailability of darolutamide with oral administration of a single 300-mg dose without food is approximately 30%. The bioavailability of darolutamide is increased by about 2- to 2.5-fold when administered with food, with a similar increase in exposure occurring for ketodarolutamide. Exposure to darolutamide and ketodarolutamide increases in a nearly linear or dose-proportional manner across a dose range of 100 to 700 mg (or about 0.17- to 1.17-fold the recommended 600-mg dosage). No further increase in exposure to darolutamide was observed at a dosage of darolutamide of 900 mg twice per day (or 1.5 times the recommended 600-mg dosage), indicating a saturation of absorption at doses above 700 mg. Following a single 600-mg dose of darolutamide, peak levels of darolutamide occur after approximately 4 hours. Steady-state levels of darolutamide occur after 2 to 5 days of continuous administration with food, during which time an approximate 2-fold accumulation in darolutamide levels occurs. At steady state with 600 mg/day darolutamide, mean levels of darolutamide are 4.79 μg/mL and area-under-the-curve levels of darolutamide over time 0 to 12 hours (AUC_{0–12}) are 52.82 h•μg/mL. Total exposure to ketodarolutamide is approximately 1.7-fold that of darolutamide.

==== Distribution ====
The volume of distribution of darolutamide with intravenous administration is 119 L. The plasma protein binding of darolutamide is 92%, with 8% circulating freely, and of ketodarolutamide is 99.8%, with 0.2% circulating unbound. As such, free levels of darolutamide in the circulation are about 40-fold higher than those of ketodarolutamide. Both darolutamide and ketodarolutamide are bound mainly to albumin. Darolutamide and ketodarolutamide has been claimed to negligibly cross the blood–brain barrier both in mice and humans. However, a subsequent study of darolutamide monotherapy in men with prostate cancer found that it increased testosterone levels, a centrally mediated antiandrogenic action. Darolutamide is a known substrate of P-glycoprotein and the breast cancer resistance protein (BCRP). P-Glycoprotein is known to play a major role in excluding drugs from the brain due to efflux back across the blood–brain barrier.

==== Metabolism ====
Darolutamide is primarily metabolized into ketodarolutamide via dehydrogenation by CYP3A4 in the liver. The medication is also conjugated via glucuronidation by UGT1A9 and UGT1A1. The elimination half-life of darolutamide and ketodarolutamide has been reported to be approximately 20 hours. A clinical study found that the elimination half-lives of darolutamide and ketodarolutamide at steady-state were 15.8 hours and 10.0 hours, respectively, with these half-lives being independent of dosage across a dose range of darolutamide of 200 to 1,800 mg/day. The elimination half-life of darolutamide is far shorter than that of enzalutamide (e.g., 1.6 hours vs. 18.3 hours in mice). The clearance of darolutamide following intravenous administration is 116 mL/min.

==== Excretion ====
After a single oral dose of darolutamide, more than 95% of the dose is excreted in urine and feces within one week following administration. A total of 63.4% darolutamide-related material is recovered in urine (about 7% as unchanged darolutamide) and a total of 32.4% darolutamide-related material (about 30% as unchanged darolutamide) is recovered in feces.

==== Variability ====
No clinically significant differences in the pharmacokinetics of darolutamide have been observed in men with nmCRPC on the basis of age (48 to 95 years), race (white, Asian, black), mild-to-moderate renal impairment, or mild hepatic impairment. In non-nmCRPC individuals with severe renal impairment not on dialysis, exposure to darolutamide was increased by about 2.5-fold relative to healthy people. In non-nmCRPC individuals with moderate hepatic impairment, darolutamide exposure was increased by about 1.9-fold compared to healthy controls. The pharmacokinetics of darolutamide have not been assessed in end-stage kidney disease or severe hepatic impairment.

== Chemistry ==
Darolutamide is a nonsteroidal compound and is structurally distinct from other marketed NSAAs, including enzalutamide and apalutamide.

== History ==
Darolutamide was developed by Orion Corporation and Bayer HealthCare. Orion Corporation applied for a patent on darolutamide in October 2010, and this patent was published in May 2011. Darolutamide entered phase I clinical trials in April 2011, with the results of the first clinical study of darolutamide initially published in 2012. The U.S. Food and Drug Administration (FDA) approved darolutamide in July 2019, under the agency's priority review designation.

Approval was based on ARAMIS, a multicenter, double-blind, placebo-controlled clinical trial in 1,509 patients with non-metastatic castration resistant prostate cancer. Patients were randomized (2:1) to receive either 600 mg darolutamide orally twice daily (n=955) or matching placebo (n=554). All patients received a gonadotropin-releasing hormone (GnRH) analog concurrently or had a previous bilateral orchiectomy. Twelve patients with previous seizure histories were treated on the darolutamide arm.

The primary endpoint was metastasis free survival (MFS), defined as the time from randomization to first evidence of distant metastasis or death from any cause within 33 weeks after the last evaluable scan, whichever occurred first. The median MFS was 40.4 months (95% CI: 34.3, not reached) for patients treated with darolutamide compared with 18.4 months (95% CI: 15.5, 22.3) for those receiving placebo (hazard ratio 0.41; 95% CI: 0.34, 0.50; p<0.0001).

Darolutamide was associated with greater benefits than placebo for all secondary end points, including overall survival (hazard ratio 0.69; 95% CI: 0.53-0.88; P=0.003), time to pain progression (median 40.3 months vs. 25.4 months; hazard ratio 0.65; 95% CI: 0.53-0.79; P<0.001), time to cytotoxic chemotherapy (hazard ratio 0.43; 95% CI: 0.31-0.60), and time to a symptomatic skeletal event (hazard ratio 0.43; 95% CI: 0.22-0.84).

== Society and culture ==
=== Generic names ===
Darolutamide is the generic name of the medication and its INN and USAN. It is also known by its developmental code names ODM-201 and BAY-1841788.

=== Brand names ===
Darolutamide is marketed under the brand name Nubeqa.

=== Availability ===
Darolutamide is available in the United States, Canada and the European Union.

== Research ==
Darolutamide monotherapy is being studied in comparison to androgen deprivation therapy with GnRH agonist or antagonist monotherapy in men with treatment-naive prostate cancer. As of 2018, it is entering a phase II clinical trial for this indication. In 2020, completion of this study had been expected in 2021 or 2022.

Darolutamide is being studied for the treatment of breast cancer in women. As of November 2019, it is in phase II clinical trials for this indication.
