= RU-56187 =

Chemical compound

Clinical data
- Drug class: Nonsteroidal antiandrogen

Identifiers
- IUPAC name: 2-(Trifluoromethyl)-4-(3,4,4-trimethyl-5-oxo-2-sulfanylideneimidazolidin-1-yl)benzonitrile
- CAS Number: 143782-25-6
- PubChem CID: 132581
- ChemSpider: 117054
- UNII: L6RT6E57LS
- ChEMBL: ChEMBL1099140
- CompTox Dashboard (EPA): DTXSID90162545

Chemical and physical data
- Formula: C_{14}H_{12}F_{3}N_{3}OS
- Molar mass: 327.33 g·mol^{−1}
- 3D model (JSmol): Interactive image
- SMILES: CC1(C(=O)N(C(=S)N1C)C2=CC(=C(C=C2)C#N)C(F)(F)F)C
- InChI: InChI=1S/C14H12F3N3OS/c1-13(2)11(21)20(12(22)19(13)3)9-5-4-8(7-18)10(6-9)14(15,16)17/h4-6H,1-3H3; Key:HLBUAKQNKJTEIU-UHFFFAOYSA-N

RU-56187 is a nonsteroidal antiandrogen which was never marketed. It shows 92% of the affinity of testosterone for the androgen receptor and negligible affinity for other steroid hormone receptors. The medication is a silent antagonist of the androgen receptor. RU-56187 is 3- to 10-fold more potent as an antiandrogen than bicalutamide or nilutamide in animals. Both RU-56187 and RU-58841 appear to be prodrugs of cyanonilutamide (RU-56279) in vivo in animals.

== See also ==
- RU-57073
- RU-58642
- RU-59063
