= Valemetostat =

Chemical compound

Clinical data
- Trade names: Ezharmia
- Other names: Valemetostat tosilate (JAN); DS-3201; DS-3201b

Identifiers
- IUPAC name: (2R)-7-Chloro-2-[4-(dimethylamino)cyclohexyl]-N-[(4,6-dimethyl-2-oxo-1H-pyridin-3-yl)methyl]-2,4-dimethyl-1,3-benzodioxole-5-carboxamide
- CAS Number: 1809336-39-7 1809336-93-3 (tosylate)
- PubChem CID: 126481870
- UNII: 60RD0234VE
- KEGG: D11662

Chemical and physical data
- Formula: C_{26}H_{34}ClN_{3}O_{4}
- Molar mass: 488.03 g·mol^{−1}

Valemetostat (trade name Ezharmia) is a drug used for the treatment of adult T-cell leukemia/lymphoma (ATL).

Valemetostat is an inhibitor of the enzymes enhancer of zeste homolog 1 (EZH1) and enhancer of zeste homolog 2 (EZH2), which are implicated in the etiology of some forms of cancer including non-Hodgkin lymphomas.

In Japan, valemetostat was approved in September 2022 for patients with relapsed or refractory adult T-cell leukemia/lymphoma.
