= Masofaniten =

Anti-cancer drug

Clinical data
- Other names: EPI-7386
- Routes of administration: By mouth
- Drug class: N-Terminal domain antiandrogen

Identifiers
- IUPAC name: ''N''-[4-[[4-[2-[3-chloro-4-(2-chloroethoxy)-5-cyanophenyl]propan-2-yl]phenoxy]methyl]pyrimidin-2-yl]methanesulfonamide
- CAS Number: 2416716-62-4
- PubChem CID: 146484310
- ChemSpider: 115275789
- UNII: OQ2SF7P8B2
- ChEMBL: ChEMBL5095106

Chemical and physical data
- Formula: C_{24}H_{24}Cl_{2}N_{4}O_{4}S
- Molar mass: 535.44 g·mol^{−1}
- 3D model (JSmol): Interactive image
- SMILES: CC(C)(C1=CC=C(C=C1)OCC2=NC(=NC=C2)NS(=O)(=O)C)C3=CC(=C(C(=C3)Cl)OCCCl)C#N
- InChI: InChI=1S/C24H24Cl2N4O4S/c1-24(2,18-12-16(14-27)22(21(26)13-18)33-11-9-25)17-4-6-20(7-5-17)34-15-19-8-10-28-23(29-19)30-35(3,31)32/h4-8,10,12-13H,9,11,15H2,1-3H3,(H,28,29,30); Key:GVCZSODXLFBYSS-UHFFFAOYSA-N

Masofaniten, also known by its developmental code name EPI-7386, is an N-terminal domain antiandrogen, or antagonist of the N-terminal domain (NTD) of the androgen receptor (AR), which was under development for the treatment of prostate cancer. The development of masofaniten has been discontinuted.

== Development history ==
The compound was developed as a successor of previous drugs in the EPI series such as EPI-001, ralaniten (EPI-002), and ralaniten acetate (EPI-506). Masofaniten showed a 20-fold improved potency than ralaniten in vitro (IC_{50} = 535 nM vs. 9,580 nM, respectively), as well as greater stability in human hepatocytes.

It entered phase I clinical trials in 2020. Preliminary results of a phase I/II clinical trial were published in 2023. A combination of masofaniten and enzalutamide (ClinicalTrials.gov Identifier: NCT06312670) was tested in clinical trials for treatment-naïve metastatic hormone-sensitive prostate cancer and showed efficacy with an acceptable safety profile suggesting that further investigation was warranted.

The development of masofaniten was discontinued by ESSA Pharma Inc in 2024 .
