= Mevrometostat =

Clinical data
- Other names: PF-06821497

Identifiers
- IUPAC name: 5,8-dichloro-2-[(4-methoxy-6-methyl-2-oxo-1H-pyridin-3-yl)methyl]-7-[(R)-methoxy(oxetan-3-yl)methyl]-3,4-dihydroisoquinolin-1-one
- CAS Number: 1844849-10-0
- PubChem CID: 118572065
- IUPHAR/BPS: 10516
- DrugBank: DB14799
- ChemSpider: 65321668
- UNII: S4L4MM20B6
- KEGG: D12845
- ChEBI: CHEBI:756584
- ChEMBL: ChEMBL4080228
- PDB ligand: CJD (PDBe, RCSB PDB)

Chemical and physical data
- Formula: C_{22}H_{24}Cl_{2}N_{2}O_{5}
- Molar mass: 467.34 g·mol^{−1}
- 3D model (JSmol): Interactive image
- SMILES: CC1=CC(=C(C(=O)N1)CN2CCC3=C(C=C(C(=C3C2=O)Cl)[C@@H](C4COC4)OC)Cl)OC
- InChI: InChI=InChI=1S/C22H24Cl2N2O5/c1-11-6-17(29-2)15(21(27)25-11)8-26-5-4-13-16(23)7-14(19(24)18(13)22(26)28)20(30-3)12-9-31-10-12/h6-7,12,20H,4-5,8-10H2,1-3H3,(H,25,27)/t20-/m1/s1; Key:RXCVUHMIWHRLDF-HXUWFJFHSA-N

Mevrometostat is an investigational new drug that is being evaluated by Pfizer for the treatment of metastatic castration‑resistant prostate cancer (mCRPC). It is a EZH2 histone methyltransferase inhibitor.

== Pharmacology ==
Mevrometostat has sub nanomolar affinity for the Y641N mutant form of EZH2 (which is a proliferation driver mutation). It also has low nanomolar inhibitory potency in reducing H3K27me3 levels and cellular proliferation in cells expressing the Y641N mutation.

== Clinical trials ==
Mevrometostat in combination with the androgen receptor antagonist enzalutamide in currently in a phase 3 clinical trial for treating advanced prostate cancer.
