= N-Desmethylapalutamide =

Chemical compound

Clinical data
- Other names: Desmethylapalutamide; Norapalutamide
- Drug class: Nonsteroidal antiandrogen

Pharmacokinetic data
- Protein binding: 95%

Identifiers
- IUPAC name: 4-[7-[6-Cyano-5-(trifluoromethyl)pyridin-3-yl]-8-oxo-6-sulfanylidene-5,7-diazaspiro[3.4]octan-5-yl]-2-fluorobenzamide
- CAS Number: 1332391-11-3
- PubChem CID: 86683490
- ChemSpider: 68007182
- UNII: 13RV85F63R
- CompTox Dashboard (EPA): DTXSID501336279

Chemical and physical data
- Formula: C_{20}H_{13}F_{4}N_{5}O_{2}S
- Molar mass: 463.41 g·mol^{−1}
- 3D model (JSmol): Interactive image
- SMILES: C1CC2(C1)C(=O)N(C(=S)N2C3=CC(=C(C=C3)C(=O)N)F)C4=CN=C(C(=C4)C(F)(F)F)C#N
- InChI: InChI=1S/C20H13F4N5O2S/c21-14-7-10(2-3-12(14)16(26)30)29-18(32)28(17(31)19(29)4-1-5-19)11-6-13(20(22,23)24)15(8-25)27-9-11/h2-3,6-7,9H,1,4-5H2,(H2,26,30); Key:BAANHOAPFBHUDX-UHFFFAOYSA-N

N-Desmethylapalutamide is a nonsteroidal antiandrogen (NSAA) and the major active metabolite of apalutamide, an NSAA which is used as a hormonal antineoplastic agent in the treatment of metastatic prostate cancer. It has similar activity to that of apalutamide and, with apalutamide therapy, circulates at similar concentrations to those of apalutamide at steady state. N-Desmethylapalutamide is formed from apalutamide in the liver by the cytochrome P450 enzymes CYP2C8 and CYP3A4.
