= RU-58642 =

Chemical compound

Clinical data
- Drug class: Nonsteroidal antiandrogen

Identifiers
- IUPAC name: 4-[3-(cyanomethyl)-4,4-dimethyl-2,5-dioxoimidazolidin-1-yl]-2-(trifluoromethyl)benzonitrile
- CAS Number: 143782-63-2
- PubChem CID: 9840708
- ChemSpider: 8016425
- UNII: DX44GS85HK
- CompTox Dashboard (EPA): DTXSID50162546

Chemical and physical data
- Formula: C_{15}H_{11}F_{3}N_{4}O_{2}
- Molar mass: 336.274 g·mol^{−1}
- 3D model (JSmol): Interactive image
- SMILES: O=C1N(CC#N)C(C)(C)C(=O)N1c(cc2C(F)(F)F)ccc2C#N
- InChI: InChI=1S/C15H11F3N4O2/c1-14(2)12(23)22(13(24)21(14)6-5-19)10-4-3-9(8-20)11(7-10)15(16,17)18/h3-4,7H,6H2,1-2H3; Key:ZVWXHSNUBLIKJH-UHFFFAOYSA-N

RU-58642 is a nonsteroidal antiandrogen (NSAA) derived from nilutamide with very high affinity and selectivity for the androgen receptor (AR), which made it among the most potent and efficacious antiandrogens known at the time of its discovery. It was investigated for topical application for the treatment of androgenetic alopecia (male-pattern baldness), but development did not proceed past initial trial stages, and it is now only used for scientific research into the AR.

== See also ==
- Cyanonilutamide
- RU-56187
- RU-57073
- RU-58841
- RU-59063
