= 3-Deazaneplanocin A =

Names
- Preferred IUPAC name (1S,2R,5R)-5-(6-Amino-9H-purin-9-yl)-3-(hydroxymethyl)cyclopent-3-ene-1,2-diol

Identifiers
CAS Number	102052-95-9
3D model (JSmol)	Interactive image
ChemSpider	65874
ECHA InfoCard	100.224.238
PubChem CID	73087
UNII	544SH4020S
CompTox Dashboard (EPA)	DTXSID30144562
- InChI: InChI=1S/C12H14N4O3/c13-12-9-7(1-2-14-12)16(5-15-9)8-3-6(4-17)10(18)11(8)19/h1-3,5,8,10-11,17-19H,4H2,(H2,13,14)/t8-,10-,11+/m1/s1 Key: OMKHWTRUYNAGFG-IEBDPFPHSA-N; InChI=1/C12H14N4O3/c13-12-9-7(1-2-14-12)16(5-15-9)8-3-6(4-17)10(18)11(8)19/h1-3,5,8,10-11,17-19H,4H2,(H2,13,14)/t8-,10-,11+/m1/s1 Key: OMKHWTRUYNAGFG-IEBDPFPHBD
- SMILES: n3ccc1c(ncn1[C@@H]2/C=C(/CO)[C@@H](O)[C@H]2O)c3N

Properties
Chemical formula	C_{12}H_{14}N_{4}O_{3}
Molar mass	262.265
- Except where otherwise noted, data are given for materials in their standard state (at 25 °C [77 °F], 100 kPa). Infobox references

3-Deazaneplanocin A (DZNep, C-c3Ado) is a drug which acts as both a S-adenosylhomocysteine synthesis inhibitor and also a histone methyltransferase EZH2 inhibitor. Studies have shown that it has effects in vitro against a variety of different tumor cell lines.

In studies on mice, the drug was also found to be effective for the treatment of Ebola virus disease, apparently interfering with the Ebola viruses ability to block interferon production, thus restoring the ability of immune system to rid the body of ebolavirus.
