= N-Desmethylenzalutamide =

Chemical compound

Clinical data
- Other names: Desmethylenzalutamide; Norenzalutamide
- Drug class: Nonsteroidal antiandrogen

Pharmacokinetic data
- Protein binding: 95%
- Elimination half-life: 7.8 days

Identifiers
- IUPAC name: 4-[3-[4-Cyano-3-(trifluoromethyl)phenyl]-5,5-dimethyl-4-oxo-2-sulfanylideneimidazolidin-1-yl]-2-fluorobenzamide
- CAS Number: 1242137-16-1
- PubChem CID: 70678916
- ChemSpider: 28533218
- UNII: 567TX6UB9S
- ChEBI: CHEBI:68538
- CompTox Dashboard (EPA): DTXSID601111408

Chemical and physical data
- Formula: C_{20}H_{14}F_{4}N_{4}O_{2}S
- Molar mass: 450.41 g·mol^{−1}
- 3D model (JSmol): Interactive image
- SMILES: CC1(C(=O)N(C(=S)N1C2=CC(=C(C=C2)C(=O)N)F)C3=CC(=C(C=C3)C#N)C(F)(F)F)C
- InChI: InChI=1S/C20H14F4N4O2S/c1-19(2)17(30)27(11-4-3-10(9-25)14(7-11)20(22,23)24)18(31)28(19)12-5-6-13(16(26)29)15(21)8-12/h3-8H,1-2H3,(H2,26,29); Key:JSFOGZGIBIQRPU-UHFFFAOYSA-N

N-Desmethylenzalutamide is a nonsteroidal antiandrogen (NSAA) and the major metabolite of enzalutamide, an NSAA which is used as a hormonal antineoplastic agent in the treatment of metastatic prostate cancer. It has similar activity to that of enzalutamide and, with enzalutamide therapy, circulates at similar concentrations to those of enzalutamide at steady state. N-Desmethylenzalutamide is formed from enzalutamide in the liver by the cytochrome P450 enzymes CYP2C8 and CYP3A4. It has a longer terminal half-life than enzalutamide (7.8 days versus 5.8 days).
