= Selective PPAR modulator =

A selective PPAR modulator (SPPARM) is a selective receptor modulator of the peroxisome proliferator-activated receptor (PPAR). Examples include SPPARMs of the PPARγ, BADGE, EPI-001, INT-131, MK-0533, and S26948.

== See also ==
- PPAR agonist
