= Selective receptor modulator =

- Drug class
- Tamoxifen, a SERM and a widely used drug in the treatment of breast cancer.

Class identifiers
- Synonyms: SRM
- Use: Various
- Biological target: Steroid hormone receptor
- Chemical class: Steroidal; Nonsteroidal

Legal status

In the field of pharmacology, a selective receptor modulator or SRM is a type of drug that has different effects in different tissues. An SRM may behave as an agonist in some tissues while as an antagonist in others. Hence selective receptor modulators are sometimes referred to as tissue selective drugs or mixed agonists / antagonists. This tissue selective behavior is in contrast to many other drugs that behave either as agonists or antagonists regardless of the tissue in question.

== Classes ==
Classes of selective receptor modulators include:

- Selective androgen receptor modulator (SARM)
- Selective estrogen receptor modulator (SERM)
- Selective glucocorticoid receptor modulator (SEGRM)
- Selective progesterone receptor modulator (SPRM)
- Selective PPAR modulator (SPPARM) including SPPARMγ (affecting the PPARγ) and SPPARMα (PPARα)

== See also ==
- Agonist–antagonist
- Selective glucocorticoid receptor agonist (SEGRA)
