= Ralaniten =

Chemical compound

Clinical data
- Other names: EPI-002
- Drug class: Nonsteroidal antiandrogen

Identifiers
- IUPAC name: (2R)-3-[4-[2-[4-[(2S)-3-Chloro-2-hydroxypropoxy]phenyl]propan-2-yl]phenoxy]propane-1,2-diol
- CAS Number: 1203490-23-6
- PubChem CID: 45107537
- ChemSpider: 58827834
- UNII: WC830G6O4X
- KEGG: D11184

Chemical and physical data
- Formula: C_{21}H_{27}ClO_{5}
- Molar mass: 394.89 g·mol^{−1}
- 3D model (JSmol): Interactive image
- SMILES: CC(C)(C1=CC=C(C=C1)OC[C@@H](CO)O)C2=CC=C(C=C2)OC[C@@H](CCl)O
- InChI: InChI=1S/C21H27ClO5/c1-21(2,15-3-7-19(8-4-15)26-13-17(24)11-22)16-5-9-20(10-6-16)27-14-18(25)12-23/h3-10,17-18,23-25H,11-14H2,1-2H3/t17-,18-/m1/s1; Key:HDTYUHNZRYZEEB-QZTJIDSGSA-N

Ralaniten (developmental code name EPI-002) is an N-terminal domain antiandrogen which was never marketed. It was codiscovered by Dr. Marianne D Sadar and Dr. Raymond J Andersen. It is a derivative of bisphenol A and one of the four stereoisomers of EPI-001. It comprises a new pharmacological class recognized by United States Adopted Names (USAN) Council called antigens which are defined as a drug designed to bind to the androgen receptor N-terminal domain. A prodrug of ralaniten, ralaniten acetate (EPI-506), was under development for the treatment of prostate cancer.

== See also ==
- Masofaniten
