= EPI-001 =

Chemical compound

Clinical data
- Drug class: Nonsteroidal antiandrogen
- ATC code: None

Identifiers
- IUPAC name: 3-(4-[2-[4-(3-Chloro-2-hydroxypropoxy)phenyl]-2-propanyl]phenoxy)-1,2-propanediol
- CAS Number: 227947-06-0
- PubChem CID: 4166922
- ChemSpider: 3378517
- UNII: A9PRH4DC8H
- CompTox Dashboard (EPA): DTXSID30400170

Chemical and physical data
- Formula: C_{21}H_{27}ClO_{5}
- Molar mass: 394.89 g·mol^{−1}
- 3D model (JSmol): Interactive image
- SMILES: ClCC(O)COc1ccc(cc1)C(c2ccc(OCC(O)CO)cc2)(C)C
- InChI: InChI=1S/C21H27ClO5/c1-21(2,15-3-7-19(8-4-15)26-13-17(24)11-22)16-5-9-20(10-6-16)27-14-18(25)12-23/h3-10,17-18,23-25H,11-14H2,1-2H3; Key:HDTYUHNZRYZEEB-UHFFFAOYSA-N

EPI-001 is the first inhibitor of the androgen receptor amino-terminal domain. The single stereoisomer of EPI-001, ralaniten (EPI-002), is a first-in-class drug that the USAN council assigned a new stem class "-aniten" and the generic name "ralaniten". This distinguishes the anitens novel molecular mechanism from anti androgens that bind the C-terminus ligand-binding domain and have the stem class "lutamide" (such as flutamide, nilutamide, bicalutamide, enzalutamide, etc.). EPI-001 and its stereoisomers and analogues were discovered by Marianne Sadar and Raymond Andersen, who co-founded the pharmaceutical company ESSA Pharma Inc (Vancouver, Canada) for the clinical development of anitens for the treatment of castration-resistant prostate cancer (CRPC).

EPI-001 is an antagonist of the androgen receptor (AR) that acts by binding covalently to the N-terminal domain (NTD) of the AR and blocking protein-protein interactions required for transcriptional activity of the AR and its splice variants (IC_{50} for inhibition of AR NTD transactivation ≈ 6 μM). This is different from all currently-used antiandrogens, which, conversely, bind to the C-terminal ligand-binding domain (LBD) of the AR and competitively block binding and activation of the receptor by androgens. Due to its unique mechanism of action, EPI-001 type compounds may prove to be effective in the treatment of advanced prostate cancer resistant to conventional antiandrogens such as enzalutamide.

EPI-001's successor, ralaniten acetate (EPI-506), a prodrug of ralaniten (EPI-002), one of the four stereoisomers of EPI-001, was under clinical investigation in a phase I study. EPI-506 was the first drug that directly binds to an intrinsically disordered region to be tested in humans and marks a leap in drug development from folded drug targets.

== Pharmacology ==
=== Pharmacodynamics ===
EPI-001 is a mixture of four stereoisomers. EPI-001 binds to the activation function-1 (AF-1) region in the NTD of the AR, as opposed to other AR antagonists, which bind to the C-terminal LBD. A functional AF-1 is essential for the AR to have transcriptional activity. If AF-1 is deleted or mutated, the AR will still bind androgens, but will have no transcriptional activity. Importantly, if the AR lacks an LBD, the receptor will be nuclear and constitutively-active. Constitutively active splice variants of the AR that lack the C-terminal LBD are correlated to CRPC and poor survival. EPI-001 is an inhibitor of constitutively active splice variant of ARs that lack the C-terminal LBD. Conventional antiandrogens do not inhibit constitutively-active variants of AR that have a truncated or deleted C-terminal LBD.

In the absence of androgen, all known antiandrogens cause translocation of AR from the cytoplasm to the nucleus, whereas EPI-001 does not cause the AR to become nuclear. Binding of EPI-001 to the NTD of the AR blocks protein-protein interactions that are essential for its transcriptional activity. Specifically, EPI-001 blocks AR interactions with CREB-binding protein, RAP74, and between the NTD and C-terminal domain (termed N/C interaction) required for antiparallel dimer formation of AR. Unlike antiandrogens such as bicalutamide, EPI-001 does not cause the AR to bind to androgen response elements on the DNA of target genes.

EPI-001 at extremely high concentrations of 50 to 200 uM has also been found to act as a selective PPARγ modulator (SPPARM), with both agonistic and antagonistic actions on the PPARγ. Via PPARγ activation, EPI-001 has been found to inhibit AR expression and activity in prostate cancer cells, indicating at least one AR-independent action by which EPI-001 exhibits antiandrogen properties in the prostate.

EPI-001 inhibits AR-dependent proliferation of human prostate cancer cells while having no significant effects on cells that do not require the AR for growth and survival. EPI-001 has specificity to the AR (aside from the PPARγ) and has excellent anti-tumor activity in vivo with xenografts of CRPC.

== See also ==
- Masofaniten
