= EZH2 =

Protein-coding gene in the species Homo sapiens

Identifiers
- Aliases: EZH2, ENX-1, ENX1, EZH1, EZH2b, KMT6, KMT6A, WVS, WVS2, enhancer of zeste 2 polycomb repressive complex 2 subunit
- External IDs: OMIM: 601573; MGI: 107940; GeneCards: EZH2
Available structures
PDB	Ortholog search: PDBe RCSB
PDB	List of PDB id codes 4MI0, 4MI5, 5HYN, 5IJ8, 5IJ7
Enzyme activity
EC #	BRENDA	ExPASy	KEGG	MetaCyc
2.1.1.356	↗	↗	↗	↗

Gene location (Human)
Chr.	Chromosome 7 (human)
Band	7q36.1	Start	148,807,257 bp
Band	7q36.1	End	148,884,321 bp

Gene location (Mouse)
Chr.	Chromosome 6 (mouse)
Band	6 B2.3|6 22.92 cM	Start	47,530,139 bp
Band	6 B2.3|6 22.92 cM	End	47,595,341 bp
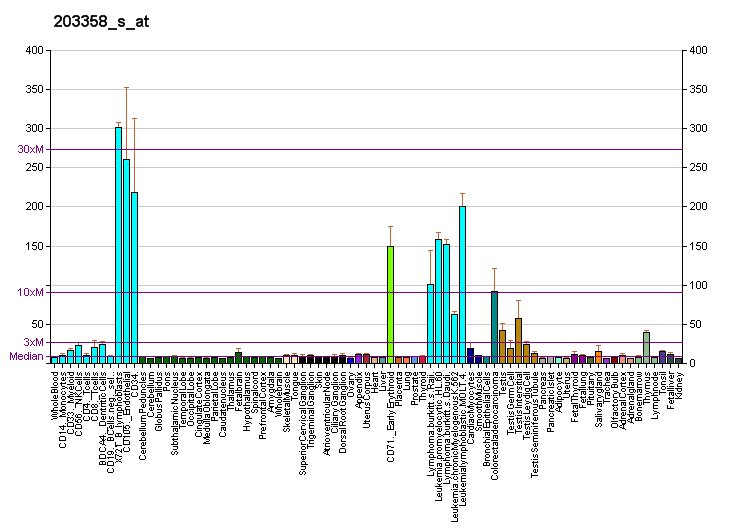
RNA expression pattern
Bgee	Human / Mouse (ortholog); Top expressed in: ganglionic eminence; ventricular zone; buccal mucosa cell; left testis; right testis; sperm; testicle; gingival epithelium; mucosa of transverse colon; skin of abdomen / Top expressed in: tail of embryo; secondary oocyte; genital tubercle; zygote; primary oocyte; ventricular zone; primitive streak; ganglionic eminence; medial ganglionic eminence; thymus; More reference expression data
BioGPS	More reference expression data
Gene ontology
Molecular function	methyltransferase activity; sequence-specific DNA binding; transferase activity; promoter-specific chromatin binding; chromatin binding; histone-lysine N-methyltransferase activity; protein-lysine N-methyltransferase activity; protein binding; RNA binding; ribonucleoprotein complex binding; chromatin DNA binding; RNA polymerase II core promoter sequence-specific DNA binding; primary miRNA binding; DNA binding; histone methyltransferase activity; histone methyltransferase activity (H3-K27 specific); RNA polymerase II cis-regulatory region sequence-specific DNA binding; DNA-binding transcription factor activity, RNA polymerase II-specific; transcription corepressor activity
Cellular component	ESC/E(Z) complex; pronucleus; nucleus; nucleoplasm; cytoplasm; telomere
Biological process	regulation of protein phosphorylation; regulation of gliogenesis; response to estradiol; regulation of transcription, DNA-templated; positive regulation of MAP kinase activity; rhythmic process; negative regulation of retinoic acid receptor signaling pathway; regulation of transcription by RNA polymerase II; negative regulation of striated muscle cell differentiation; G1 to G0 transition; negative regulation of transcription by RNA polymerase II; positive regulation of dendrite development; positive regulation of epithelial to mesenchymal transition; negative regulation of transcription elongation from RNA polymerase II promoter; transcription, DNA-templated; negative regulation of DNA-binding transcription factor activity; positive regulation of protein serine/threonine kinase activity; negative regulation of gene expression; negative regulation of G1/S transition of mitotic cell cycle; histone H3-K27 methylation; positive regulation of GTPase activity; DNA methylation; negative regulation of epidermal cell differentiation; methylation; negative regulation of gene expression, epigenetic; regulation of cell population proliferation; regulation of circadian rhythm; skeletal muscle satellite cell maintenance involved in skeletal muscle regeneration; cerebellar cortex development; regulation of gene expression; negative regulation of transcription, DNA-templated; protein localization to chromatin; hippocampus development; regulation of neurogenesis; cellular response to hydrogen peroxide; response to tetrachloromethane; cellular response to trichostatin A; histone H3-K27 trimethylation; cardiac muscle hypertrophy in response to stress; hepatocyte homeostasis; liver regeneration; histone methylation; negative regulation of G0 to G1 transition; chromatin organization; positive regulation of cell population proliferation; positive regulation of cell cycle G1/S phase transition
Sources:Amigo / QuickGO
Orthologs
Databases	NCBI: entry; OMA: entry
Species	Human	Mouse
Entrez	2146	14056
Ensembl	ENSG00000106462	ENSMUSG00000029687
UniProt	Q15910	Q61188
RefSeq (mRNA)	NM_001203247; NM_001203248; NM_001203249; NM_004456; NM_152998	NM_001146689; NM_007971
RefSeq (protein)	NP_001190176; NP_001190177; NP_001190178; NP_004447; NP_694543	NP_001140161; NP_031997
Location (UCSC)	Chr 7: 148.81 – 148.88 Mb	Chr 6: 47.53 – 47.6 Mb
PubMed search
- Wikidata
View/Edit Human	View/Edit Mouse

Enhancer of zeste homolog 2 (EZH2) is a histone-lysine N-methyltransferase enzyme (EC 2.1.1.43) encoded by EZH2 gene, that participates in histone methylation and, ultimately, transcriptional repression. EZH2 catalyzes the addition of methyl groups to histone H3 at lysine 27, by using the cofactor S-adenosyl-L-methionine. Methylation activity of EZH2 facilitates heterochromatin formation thereby silences gene function. Remodeling of chromosomal heterochromatin by EZH2 is also required during cell mitosis.

EZH2 is the functional enzymatic component of the Polycomb Repressive Complex 2 (PRC2), which is responsible for healthy embryonic development through the epigenetic maintenance of genes responsible for regulating development and differentiation. EZH2 is responsible for the methylation activity of PRC2, and the complex also contains proteins required for optimal function (EED, SUZ12, JARID2, AEBP2, RbAp46/48, and PCL).

Mutation or over-expression of EZH2 has been linked to many forms of cancer. EZH2 inhibits genes responsible for suppressing tumor development, and blocking EZH2 activity may slow tumor growth. EZH2 has been targeted for inhibition because it is upregulated in multiple cancers including, but not limited to, breast, prostate, melanoma, and bladder cancer. Mutations in the EZH2 gene are also associated with Weaver syndrome, a rare congenital disorder, and EZH2 is involved in causing neurodegenerative symptoms in the nervous system disorder, ataxia telangiectasia.

== Function ==
Histone-lysine N-methyltransferase

Identifiers
- EC no.: 2.1.1.43

Databases
- BRENDA: enzyme data
- ExPASy: NiceZyme view
- KEGG: enzyme entry
- MetaCyc: metabolic pathway
- Rhea: reactions
- PDB structures: RCSB PDB PDBe PDBsum
Search
- PMC: articles
- PubMed: articles
- NCBI: proteins

EZH2 is the catalytic subunit of the Polycomb Repressive Complex 2 (PRC2). EZH2's catalytic activity relies on its formation of a complex with at least two other PRC2 components, SUZ12 and EED.

As a histone methyltransferase (HMTase), EZH2's primary function is to methylate Lys-27 on histone 3 (H3K27me) by transferring a methyl group from the cofactor S-adenosyl-L-methionine (SAM). EZH2 is capable of mono-, di-, and tri-methylation of H3K27 and has been associated with a variety of biological functions, including transcriptional regulation in hematopoiesis, development, and cell differentiation.

EZH2 has also been identified as capable of methylating non-histone proteins.

=== Transcription repression ===
EZH2, as a part of PRC2, catalyzes trimethylation of H3K27 (H3K27me3), which is a histone modification that has been characterized as part of the histone code. The histone code is the theory that chemical modifications, such as methylation, acetylation, and ubiquitination, of histone proteins play distinctive roles in epigenetic regulation of gene transcription. EZH2-mediated catalysis of H3K27me3 is associated with long term transcription repression.

EZH2, as well as other Polycomb group proteins, are involved in establishing and maintaining gene repression through cell division. This transcriptionally repressive state is thought to be due to PRC2/EZH2-EED-mediated H3K27 methylation and subsequent recruitment of PRC1 which facilitates condensation of chromatin and formation of heterochromatin. Heterochromatin is tightly packed chromatin which limits the accessibility of transcription machinery to the underlying DNA, thereby suppressing transcription.

During cell division, heterochromatin formation is required for proper chromosome segregation. PRC2/EED-EZH2 complex may also be involved in the recruitment of DNA methyltransferases (DNMTs), which results in increased DNA methylation, another epigenetic layer of transcription repression. Specific genes that have been identified as targets of EZH2-mediated transcriptional repression include HOXA9, HOXC8, MYT1, CDKN2A and retinoic acid target genes.

=== Transcription activation ===
In cancer, EZH2 may play a role in activation of transcription, independently of PRC2. In breast cancer cells, EZH2 has been demonstrated to activate NF-κB target genes, which are involved in responses to stimuli. The functional role of this activity and its mechanism are still unknown.

=== Development and cell differentiation ===
EZH2 plays an essential role in development. In particular, it helps control transcriptional repression of genes that regulate cell differentiation. In embryonic stem cells, EZH2-mediated trimethylation of H3K27me3 in regions containing developmental genes appears to be important for maintenance of normal cell differentiation. H3K27me3 is also important in driving X-inactivation, the silencing of one X-chromosome in females during development. During X-inactivation, it is thought that EZH2 is involved in initiating heterochromatin formation by trimethylating H3K27 and that other histone methyltransferases and histone marks may be involved in maintaining the silenced state.

Further, EZH2 has been identified as an essential protein involved in development and differentiation of B-cells and T-cells. H3K27me3 is involved in suppressing genes that promote differentiation, thus maintaining an undifferentiated state of B- and T-cells and playing an important role in regulating hematopoiesis.

=== Regulation of EZH2 activity ===
The activity of EZH2 is regulated by the post-translational phosphorylation of threonine and serine residues on EZH2. Specifically, phosphorylation of T350 has been linked to an increase in EZH2 activity while phosphorylation of T492 and S21 have been linked to a decrease in EZH2 activity. Phosphorylation of T492 has been suggested to disrupt contacts between human EZH2 and its binding partners in the PRC2 complex, thus hindering its catalytic activity.

In addition to phosphorylation, it has also been shown that PRC2/EZH2-EED activity is antagonized by transcription-activating histone marks, such as acetylation of H3K27 (H3K27ac) and methylation of H3K36 (H3K36me).

EZH2 expression is regulated by estrogen signaling in human normal breast epithelium and human breast cancers.

== Enzymatic activity ==
EZH2 function is highly dependent upon its recruitment by the PRC2 complex. In particular, WD40-repeat protein embryonic ectoderm development (EED) and zinc finger protein suppressor of zeste 12 (SUZ12) are needed to stabilize the interaction of EZH2 with its histone substrate Recently, two isoforms of EZH2 generated from alternative splicing have been identified in humans: EZH2α and EZH2β. Both isoforms contain elements that have been identified as important for EZH2 function including the nuclear localization signal, the EED and SUZ12 binding sites as well as the conserved SET domain. Most studies have thus far focused on the longer isoform EZH2α, but EZH2β, which lacks exons 4 and 8, has been shown to be active. Furthermore, PRC2/EZH2β complexes act on distinct genes from that of its PRC2/EZH2α counterpart suggesting that each isoform may act to regulate a specific subset of genes. Additional evidence suggests that EZH2 may also be capable of lysine methylation independent of association with PRC2, when EZH2 is highly upregulated.

=== Lysine methylation ===
Lysine can be methylated up to three times on its terminal ammonium group.

Methylation is the addition of a -CH_{3}, or methyl group, to another molecule. In biology, methylation is typically catalyzed by enzymes, and methyl groups are commonly added to either proteins or nucleic acids. In EZH2-catalyzed methylation, the amino acid lysine in the histone h3 is methylated. This amino acid residue can be methylated up to three times on its terminal ammonium group. These methylated lysines are important in the control of mammalian gene expression and have a functional role in heterochromatin formation, X-chromosome inactivation and transcriptional regulation. In mammalian chromosomes, histone lysine methylation can either activate or repress genes depending the site of methylation. Recent work has shown that at least part of the silencing function of the EZH2 complex is the methylation of histone H3 on lysine 27. Methylation, and other modifications, take place on the histones. Methyl modifications can affect the binding of proteins to these histones and either activate or inhibit transcription.

=== Mechanism of catalysis ===
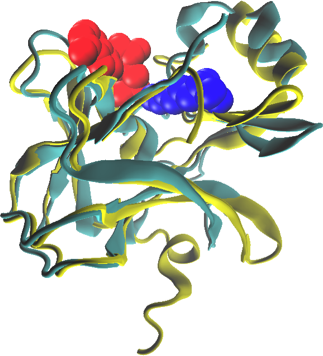
STAMP Alignment of EZH2 (Yellow; PDB: 4MI0) and Human SET7/9 (Cyan; PDB:1O9S) SET Domains with SAM (red) and Lysine (blue) bound.

EZH2 is a member of the SET domain family of lysine methyltransferases which function to add methyl groups to lysine side chains of substrate proteins. SET methyltransferases depend on a S-Adenosyl methionine (SAM) cofactor to act as a methyl donor for their catalytic activity. SET domain proteins differ from other SAM-dependent methyltransferases in that they bind their substrate and SAM cofactor on opposite sides of the active site of the enzyme. This orientation of substrate and cofactor allows SAM to dissociate without disrupting substrate binding and can lead to multiple rounds of lysine methylation without substrate dissociation.

Although neither a substrate-bound or SAM-bound crystal structure for EZH2 has been determined, STAMP structure alignment with the human SET7/9 methyltransferase shows conserved tyrosine residues in almost identical positions within the putative active site of EZH2.

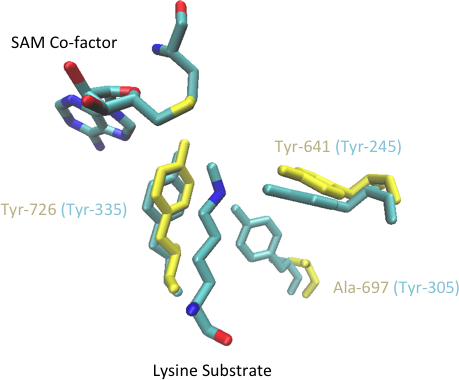
STAMP Alignment of EZH2 (Yellow; PDB: 4MI0) and Human SET7/9 (Cyan; PDB:1O9S) Active Site Residues

It had been previously suggested that tyrosine 726 in the EZH2 active site was acting as a general base to de-protonate the substrate lysine but kinetic isotope effects have indicated that active site residues are not directly involved in the chemistry of the methyltransferase reaction. Instead these experiments support a mechanism in which the residues lower the pKa of the substrate lysine residue while simultaneously providing a channel for water to access the lysine side chain within the interior of the active site. Bulk solvent water can then easily deprotonate the lysine side chain, activating it for nucleophilic attack of the SAM cofactor in an S_{N}2-like reaction resulting in transfer of the methyl group from SAM to the lysine side chain.

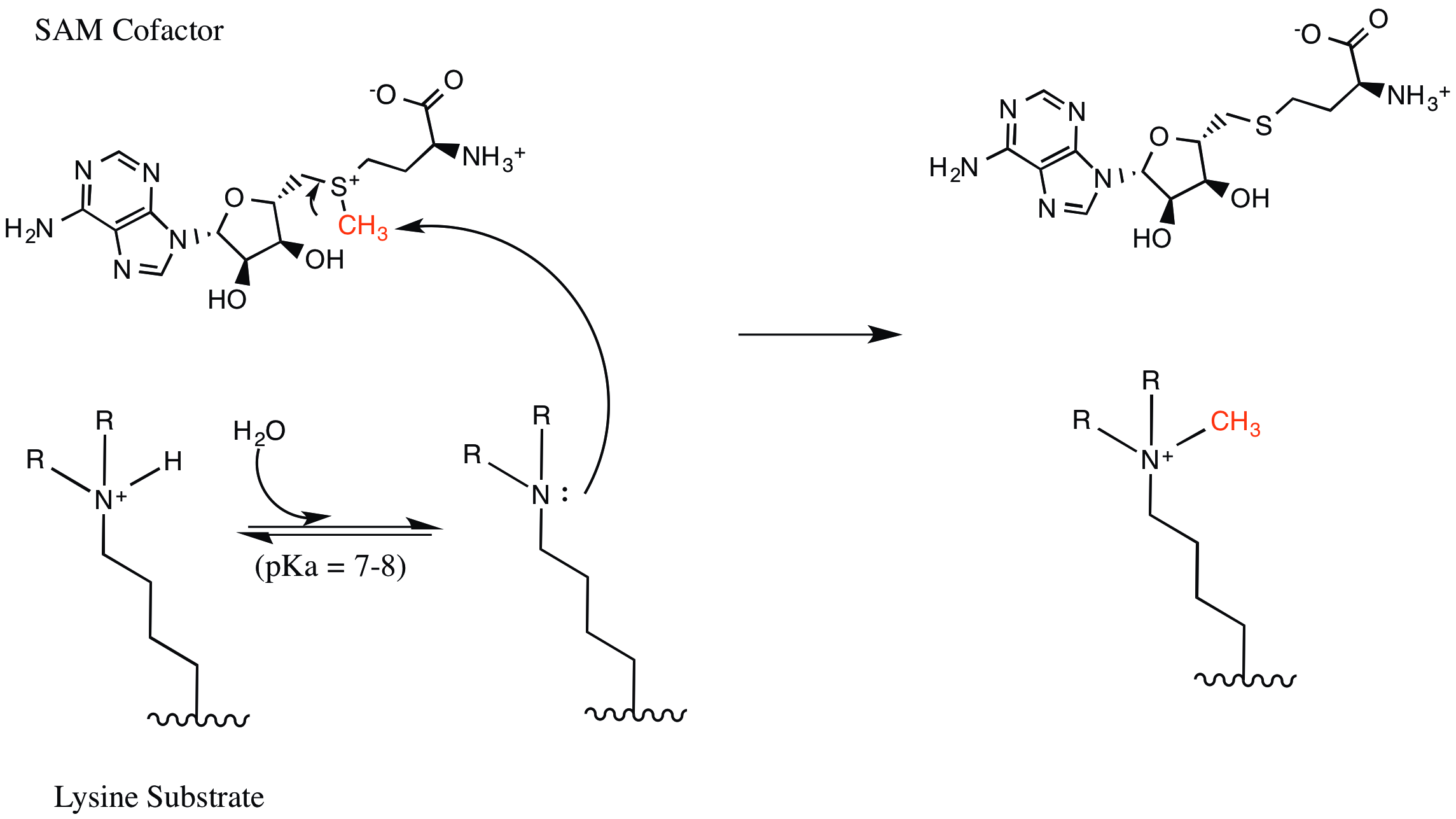
Putative Catalytic Mechanism for EZH2

EZH2 primarily catalyzes mono- and di-methylation of H3K27 but a clinically relevant mutation of residue tyrosine 641 to phenylalanine (Y641F) results in higher H3K27 tri-methylation activity. It is proposed that the removal of the hydroxyl group on Y641 abrogates steric hindrance and allows for accommodation of a third methyl group on the substrate lysine.

== Clinical significance ==
=== Cancer ===
EZH2 is an attractive target for anti-cancer therapy because it helps cancerous cells divide and proliferate. It is found in larger amounts than in healthy cells in a wide range of cancers including breast, prostate, bladder, uterine, and renal cancers, as well as melanoma and lymphoma. EZH2 is a gene suppressor, so when it becomes overexpressed, many tumor suppressor genes that are normally turned on, are turned off. Inhibition of EZH2 function shrinks malignant tumors in some reported cases because those tumor suppressor genes are not silenced by EZH2. EZH2 typically is not expressed in healthy adults; it is only found in actively dividing cells, like those active during fetal development. Because of this characteristic, overexpression of EZH2 can be used as a diagnostic marker of cancer and some neurodegenerative disorders. However, there are cases where it is difficult to tell whether overexpression of EZH2 is the cause of a disease, or simply a consequence. If it is only a consequence, targeting EZH2 for inhibition may not cure the disease. One example of a cancer pathway in which EZH2 plays a role is the pRB-E2F pathway. It is downstream from the pRB-E2F pathway, and signals from this pathway lead to EZH2 overexpression. Another important characteristic of EZH2 is that when EZH2 is overexpressed, it can activate genes without forming PRC2. This is an issue because it means the methylation activity of the enzyme is not mediated by complex formation. In breast cancer cells, EZH2 activates genes that promote cell proliferation and survival. It can also activate regulatory genes like c-myc and cyclin D1 by interacting with Wnt signaling factors. Importantly, the mutation of tyrosine 641 in the active SET domain to a number of different amino acids is a common feature of some B-cell lymphomas.

Schematic depicting the effects of overexpression of EZH2 and mutation of EZH2 on transcription.

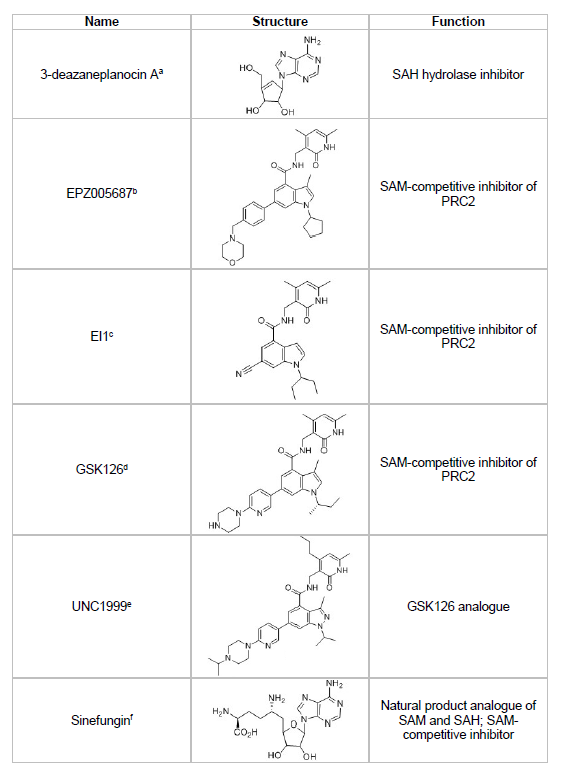
EZH2 Inhibitors.^{a}; ^{b}; ^{c}; ^{d}; ^{e}; ^{f}

=== Inhibitors ===
Developing an inhibitor of EZH2 and preventing unwanted histone methylation of tumor suppressor genes is a viable area of cancer research. EZH2 inhibitor development has focused on targeting the SET domain active site of the protein. Several inhibitors of EZH2 have been developed as of 2015, including 3-deazaneplanocin A (DZNep), EPZ005687, EI1, GSK126, and UNC1999.

- DZNep DZNep has potential antiviral and anti-cancer properties because it lowers EZH2 levels and induces apoptosis in breast and colon cancer cells. DZNep inhibits the hydrolysis of S-adenosyl-L-homocysteine (SAH), which is a product-based inhibitor of all protein methyltransferases, leading to increased cellular concentrations of SAH which in turn inhibits EZH2. However, DZNep is not specific to EZH2 and also inhibits other DNA methyltransferases.
- EPZ005687: In 2012, a company called Epizyme revealed EPZ005687, an S-adenosylmethionine (SAM) competitive inhibitor that is more selective than DZNep; it has a 50-fold increase in selectivity for EZH2 compared to EZH1. The drug blocks EZH2 activity by binding to the SET domain active site of the enzyme. EPZ005687 can also inhibit the Y641 and A677 mutants of EZH2, which may be applicable for treating non-Hodgkin's lymphoma.
- Sinefungin: Sinefungin is another SAM-competitive inhibitor, however, like DZNep, it is not specific to EZH2. It works by binding in the cofactor binding pocket of DNA methyltransferases to block methyl transfer. EI1 is another inhibitor, developed by Novartis, that showed EZH2 inhibitory activity in lymphoma tumor cells, including cells with the Y641 mutation. The mechanism of this inhibitor also involves competing with the SAM cofactor for binding to EZH2.
- GSK-2816126: GSK126 is a potent, SAM-competitive EZH2 inhibitor developed by GlaxoSmithKline, that has 150-fold selectivity over EZH1 and a K_{i} of 0.5-3 nM. UNC1999 was developed as an analogue of GSK126, and was the first orally bioavailable EZH2 inhibitor to show activity. However, it is less selective than its counterpart GSK126, and it binds to EZH1 as well, increasing the potential for off-target effects.
- Tazemetostat: In 2013, Epizyme began Phase I clinical trials with another EZH2 inhibitor, tazemetostat (EPZ-6438), for patients with B-cell lymphoma. In 2020, tazemetostat, with the tradename Tazverik, gained an FDA accelerated approval for the treatment of metastatic or locally advanced epithelioid sarcoma and an accelerated approval for the treatment of patients with relapsed follicular lymphoma later that year.
- Valemetostat dual EZH1/EZH2 inhibitor, approved for use in Japan for T-cell leukemia/lymphoma
- Mevrometostat selective EZH2 inhibitor, currently in phase 3 trials for prostate cancer

Combination therapies are being studied as possible treatments when primary treatments begin to fail. Etoposide, a topoisomerase inhibitor, when combined with an EZH2 inhibitor, becomes more effective for non-small cell lung cancers with BRG1 and EGFR mutations. However, EZH2 and lysine methylation can have tumor suppressing activity, for example in myelodysplastic syndrome, indicating that EZH2 inhibition may not be beneficial in all cases.

=== Skeletal development ===
EZH2 is crucial for epigenetic regulation of specific patterning during osteochondrogenesis, or bone and cartilage development, of the craniofacial skeletal elements. By repressing inhibitors, EZH2 promotes bone and cartilage formation in facial skeletal features arising from the neural crest. Above average EZH2 expression has become a biological marker for the most aggressive form for breast cancer known as Inflammatory Breast Cancer (IBC). But in 2013, a study performed by Zhaomei Mu and his associates concluded that the knockdown gene for EZH2 inhibited both the migration and invasion of IBC cells. Also in vivo, its knockdown gene suppressed tumor growth, most likely by the presence of fewer blood vessels, or reduced angiogenesis, in the EZH2 knockdown tumor versus EZH2 tumors.

=== Weaver syndrome ===
Mutations in the EZH2 gene have been linked with Weaver syndrome, a rare disorder characterized by advanced bone age, macrocephaly, and hypertelorism. The histidine residue in the active site of the wild-type EZH2 was mutated to tyrosine in patients diagnosed with Weaver syndrome. The mutation likely interferes with cofactor binding and causes disruption of the natural function of the protein.

== Taxonomic distribution ==
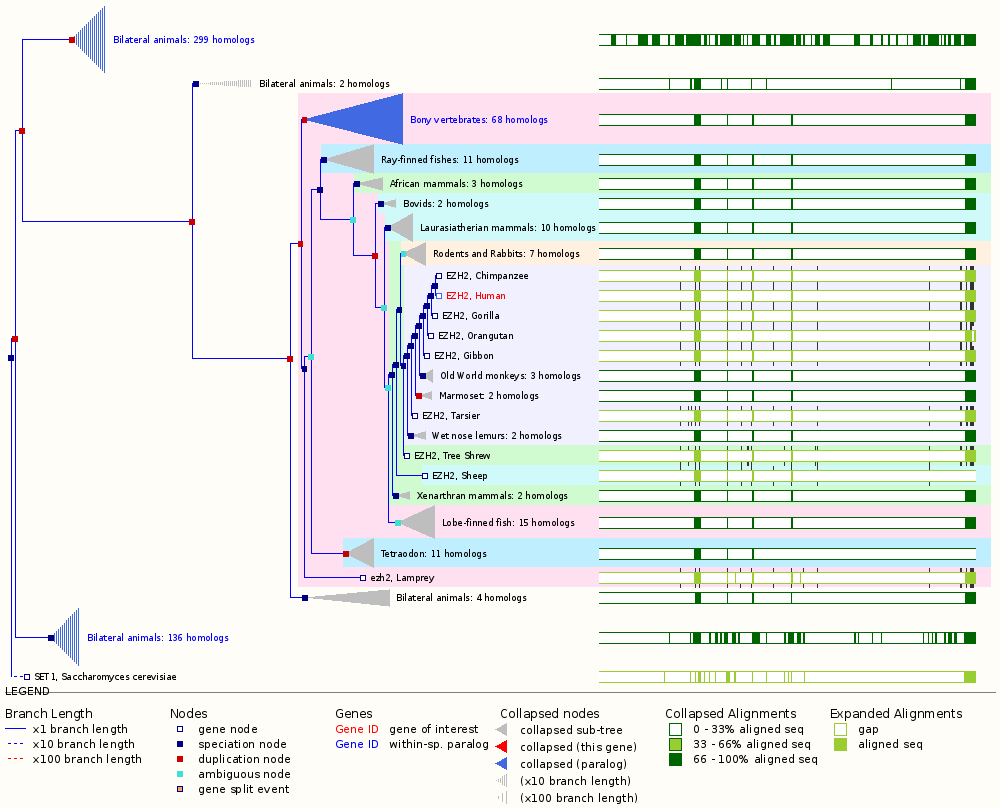
Ensembl Gene Tree of homologs of EZH2. This gene tree was generated using the Ensembl database, using all 587 genes for EZH2 and the species each gene is found in.

Enhancer of zeste (E(z)) was originally identified in Drosophila melanogaster, and its mammalian homologs were subsequently identified and named EZH1 (enhancer of zeste homolog 1) and EZH2 (enhancer of zeste homolog 2). EZH2 is highly conserved through evolution. It and its homologs play essential roles in development, cell differentiation, and cell division in plants, insects, fish, and mammals. The following taxonomic tree is a depiction of EZH2's distribution throughout a wide variety of species.

== See also ==
- Ezh2 gene
