= RD-162 =

Chemical compound

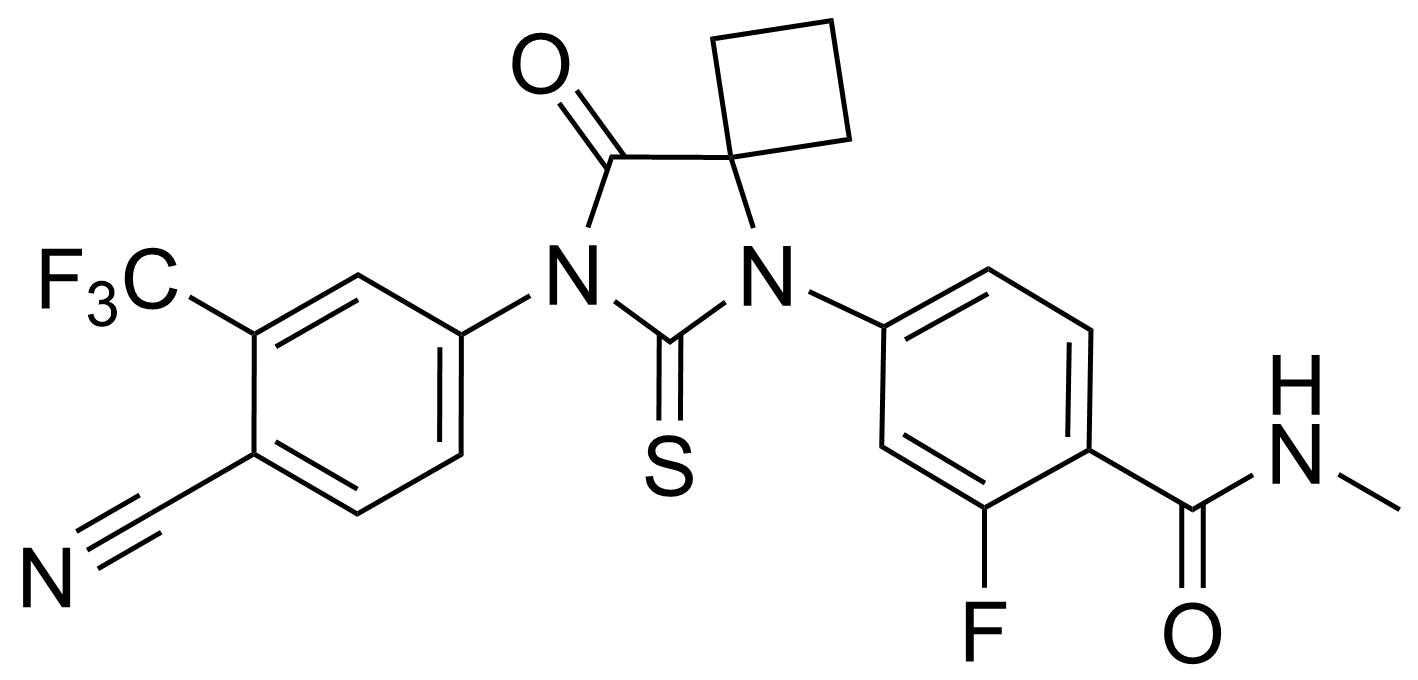

Clinical data
- Routes of administration: By mouth
- Drug class: Nonsteroidal antiandrogen

Identifiers
- IUPAC name: 4-[7-[4-cyano-3-(trifluoromethyl)phenyl]-8-oxo-6-sulfanylidene-5,7-diazaspiro[3.4]octan-5-yl]-2-fluoro-N-methylbenzamide
- CAS Number: 915087-27-3
- PubChem CID: 11957756
- ChemSpider: 10132004
- UNII: 5ZE6THH5VF
- ChEMBL: ChEMBL1082410
- CompTox Dashboard (EPA): DTXSID301337376

Chemical and physical data
- Formula: C_{22}H_{16}F_{4}N_{4}O_{2}S
- Molar mass: 476.45 g·mol^{−1}
- 3D model (JSmol): Interactive image
- SMILES: CNC(=O)C1=C(C=C(C=C1)N2C(=S)N(C(=O)C23CCC3)C4=CC(=C(C=C4)C#N)C(F)(F)F)F
- InChI: InChI=1S/C22H16F4N4O2S/c1-28-18(31)15-6-5-14(10-17(15)23)30-20(33)29(19(32)21(30)7-2-8-21)13-4-3-12(11-27)16(9-13)22(24,25)26/h3-6,9-10H,2,7-8H2,1H3,(H,28,31); Key:JPQFGMYHKSKKGW-UHFFFAOYSA-N

RD-162 is a second-generation nonsteroidal antiandrogen (NSAA) which was developed for the treatment of prostate cancer but was never marketed. It acts as a potent and selective silent antagonist of the androgen receptor (AR). The drug is a diarylthiohydantoin derivative. It is closely related to enzalutamide and apalutamide. Both RD-162 and enzalutamide show 5- to 8-fold higher affinity for the AR than the first-generation NSAA bicalutamide, and only 2- to 3-fold lower affinity than dihydrotestosterone (DHT), the major endogenous ligand of the receptor in the prostate gland.

RD-162 and enzalutamide were developed together and were derived from the nonsteroidal androgen RU-59063, which itself was derived from the first-generation NSAA nilutamide. RD-162 and enzalutamide were selected as the lead compounds from a group of over 200 compounds that were synthesized and assayed for antiandrogenic activity. Enzalutamide was ultimately selected from the two for further clinical development and was eventually marketed. RD-162 is also very closely related to apalutamide, with the two compounds differing only by the replacement of a single atom (a carbon atom in one of the phenyl rings of RD-162 swapped with a nitrogen atom in apalutamide). Apalutamide was approved for the treatment of prostate cancer in 2018.
