= Cyanonilutamide =

Chemical compound

Clinical data
- Other names: RU-56279
- Drug class: Nonsteroidal antiandrogen

Identifiers
- IUPAC name: 4-(4,4-Dimethyl-2,5-dioxoimidazolidin-1-yl)-2-(trifluoromethyl)benzonitrile
- CAS Number: 143782-20-1
- PubChem CID: 11162285
- ChemSpider: 9337385
- UNII: 6PAG4TC385
- ChEMBL: ChEMBL146858
- CompTox Dashboard (EPA): DTXSID901143349

Chemical and physical data
- Formula: C_{13}H_{10}F_{3}N_{3}O_{2}
- Molar mass: 297.237 g·mol^{−1}
- 3D model (JSmol): Interactive image
- SMILES: CC1(C(=O)N(C(=O)N1)C2=CC(=C(C=C2)C#N)C(F)(F)F)C
- InChI: InChI=1S/C13H10F3N3O2/c1-12(2)10(20)19(11(21)18-12)8-4-3-7(6-17)9(5-8)13(14,15)16/h3-5H,1-2H3,(H,18,21); Key:CYCKLVAQENOQPG-UHFFFAOYSA-N

Cyanonilutamide (developmental code name RU-56279) is a nonsteroidal antiandrogen which was never marketed. Both RU-56187 and RU-58841 appear to be prodrugs of cyanonilutamide in vivo in animals. It has relatively low affinity for the androgen receptor but nonetheless shows significant antiandrogenic activity in animals.

== See also ==
- 5N-Bicalutamide
- Nilutamide
- RU-56187
- RU-58642
- RU-59063
