= PHF1 =

Protein-coding gene in the species Homo sapiens

Identifiers
- Aliases: PHF1, MTF2L2, PCL1, PHF2, TDRD19C, hPHD finger protein 1
- External IDs: OMIM: 602881; MGI: 98647; GeneCards: PHF1
Available structures
PDB	Ortholog search: PDBe RCSB
PDB	List of PDB id codes 2E5P, 2M0O, 4HCZ

Gene location (Human)
Chr.	Chromosome 6 (human)
Band	6p21.32	Start	33,410,399 bp
Band	6p21.32	End	33,416,453 bp

Gene location (Mouse)
Chr.	Chromosome 17 (mouse)
Band	17 A3.3|17 13.6 cM	Start	27,152,026 bp
Band	17 A3.3|17 13.6 cM	End	27,156,882 bp
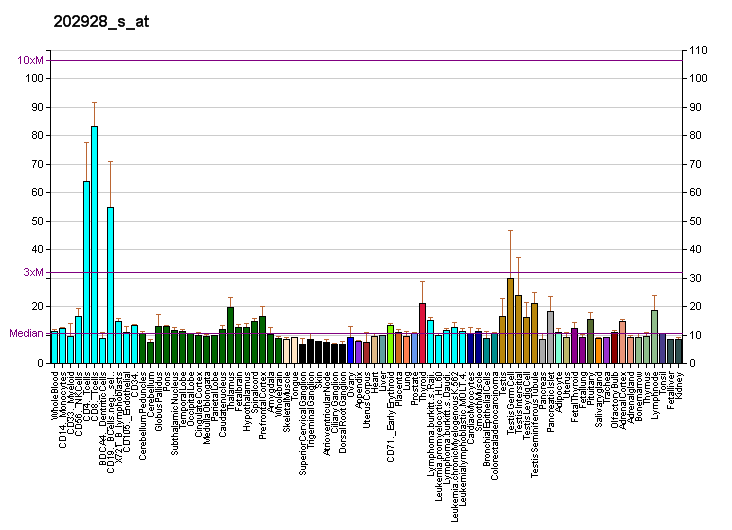

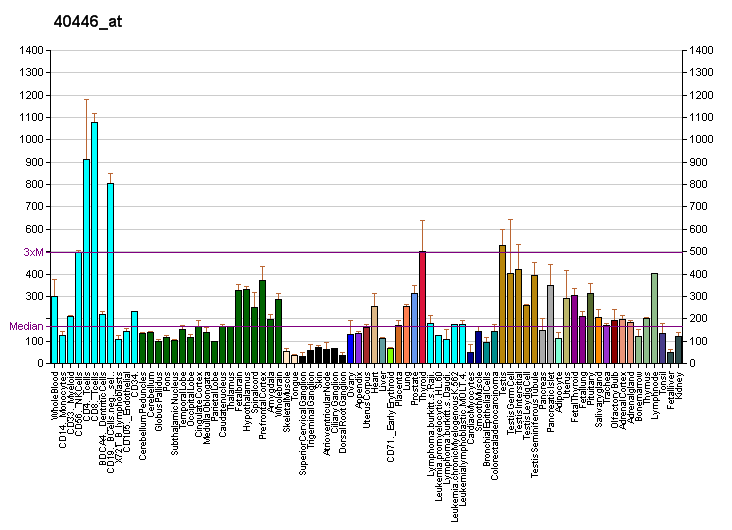
RNA expression pattern
Bgee	Human / Mouse (ortholog); Top expressed in: left testis; right testis; pituitary gland; anterior pituitary; left ovary; right ovary; left lobe of thyroid gland; right lobe of thyroid gland; canal of the cervix; gastric mucosa / Top expressed in: granulocyte; zygote; spermatocyte; secondary oocyte; primary oocyte; spermatid; neural layer of retina; ankle joint; seminiferous tubule; entorhinal cortex; More reference expression data
BioGPS	More reference expression data
Gene ontology
Molecular function	DNA-binding transcription factor activity; metal ion binding; methylated histone binding; protein binding; chromatin binding; nucleosome binding; sequence-specific DNA binding
Cellular component	cytoplasm; site of double-strand break; ESC/E(Z) complex; nucleoplasm; microtubule organizing center; cytoskeleton; nucleus; centrosome
Biological process	negative regulation of histone H3-K27 methylation; regulation of transcription, DNA-templated; transcription, DNA-templated; cellular response to DNA damage stimulus; regulation of histone methylation; negative regulation of gene expression, epigenetic; positive regulation of histone H3-K27 methylation; chromatin organization; positive regulation of transcription, DNA-templated
Sources:Amigo / QuickGO
Orthologs
Databases	NCBI: entry; OMA: entry
Species	Human	Mouse
Entrez	5252	21652
Ensembl	ENSG00000112511; ENSG00000225553; ENSG00000239756	ENSMUSG00000024193
UniProt	O43189	Q9Z1B8
RefSeq (mRNA)	NM_002636; NM_024165	NM_009343; NM_001302397
RefSeq (protein)	NP_002627; NP_077084	NP_001289326; NP_033369
Location (UCSC)	Chr 6: 33.41 – 33.42 Mb	Chr 17: 27.15 – 27.16 Mb
PubMed search
- Wikidata
View/Edit Human	View/Edit Mouse

PHD finger protein 1 is a protein that in humans is encoded by the PHF1 gene.

== Function ==
This gene encodes a protein with significant sequence similarity to Drosophila Polycomblike. The encoded protein contains a zinc finger-like PHD (plant homeodomain) finger which is distinct from other classes of zinc finger motifs and which shows the typical Cys4-His-Cys3 arrangement. PHD finger genes are thought to belong to a diverse group of transcriptional regulators possibly affecting eukaryotic gene expression by influencing chromatin structure. Two transcript variants have been found for this gene.
