= N-Terminal domain antiandrogen =

- Drug class
- EPI-001, the first major N-terminal domain AR antagonist to be developed.

Class identifiers
- Synonyms: N-Terminal domain AR antagonists; AR NTD antagonists
- Use: Prostate cancer
- Biological target: Androgen receptor

Legal status

N-Terminal domain antiandrogens are a novel type of antiandrogen that bind to the N-terminal domain of the androgen receptor (AR) instead of the ligand-binding domain (where all currently-available antiandrogens bind) and disrupt interactions between the AR and its coregulatory binding partners, thereby blocking AR-mediated gene transcription. They are being investigated for the treatment of prostate cancer.

== See also ==
- Androgen deprivation therapy
- 5N-Bicalutamide
