= RU-59063 =

Chemical compound

Clinical data
- Drug class: Nonsteroidal androgen; Selective androgen receptor modulator

Identifiers
- IUPAC name: 4-[3-(4-Hydroxybutyl)-4,4-dimethyl-5-oxo-2-sulfanylideneimidazolidin-1-yl]-2-(trifluoromethyl)benzonitrile
- CAS Number: 155180-53-3
- PubChem CID: 197655
- ChemSpider: 171095
- UNII: 3LRS7FXN3G
- ChEMBL: ChEMBL331820
- CompTox Dashboard (EPA): DTXSID50165850

Chemical and physical data
- Formula: C_{17}H_{18}F_{3}N_{3}O_{2}S
- Molar mass: 385.41 g·mol^{−1}
- 3D model (JSmol): Interactive image
- SMILES: N#CC1=CC=C(N2C(N(CCCCO)C(C)(C)C2=O)=S)C=C1C(F)(F)F
- InChI: InChI=1S/C17H18F3N3O2S/c1-16(2)14(25)23(15(26)22(16)7-3-4-8-24)12-6-5-11(10-21)13(9-12)17(18,19)20/h5-6,9,24H,3-4,7-8H2,1-2H3; Key:FIDNKDVRTLFETI-UHFFFAOYSA-N

RU-59063 is a nonsteroidal androgen or selective androgen receptor modulator (SARM) which was first described in 1994 and was never marketed. It was originally thought to be a potent antiandrogen, but subsequent research found that it actually possesses dose-dependent androgenic activity, albeit with lower efficacy than dihydrotestosterone (DHT). The drug is an N-substituted arylthiohydantoin and was derived from the first-generation nonsteroidal antiandrogen (NSAA) nilutamide. The second-generation NSAAs enzalutamide, RD-162, and apalutamide were derived from RU-59063.

RU-59063 has a high affinity for the human androgen receptor (AR) (K_{i} = 2.2 nM; K_{a} = 5.4 nM) and 1,000-fold selectivity for the AR over other nuclear steroid hormone receptors, including the PR, ER, GR, and MR. It shows 3- and 8-fold higher affinity than testosterone for the rat and human AR, respectively, and up to 100-fold higher affinity for the rat AR than the first-generation NSAAs flutamide, nilutamide, and bicalutamide. It also has a slightly higher affinity for the AR than DHT and nearly equal affinity to that of the very-high-affinity AR ligand metribolone (R-1881). In addition, RU-59063, unlike testosterone and DHT, shows no specific binding to human plasma.

== See also ==
- Cyanonilutamide
- RU-58642
- RU-58841
