= Apalutamide =

Chemical compound

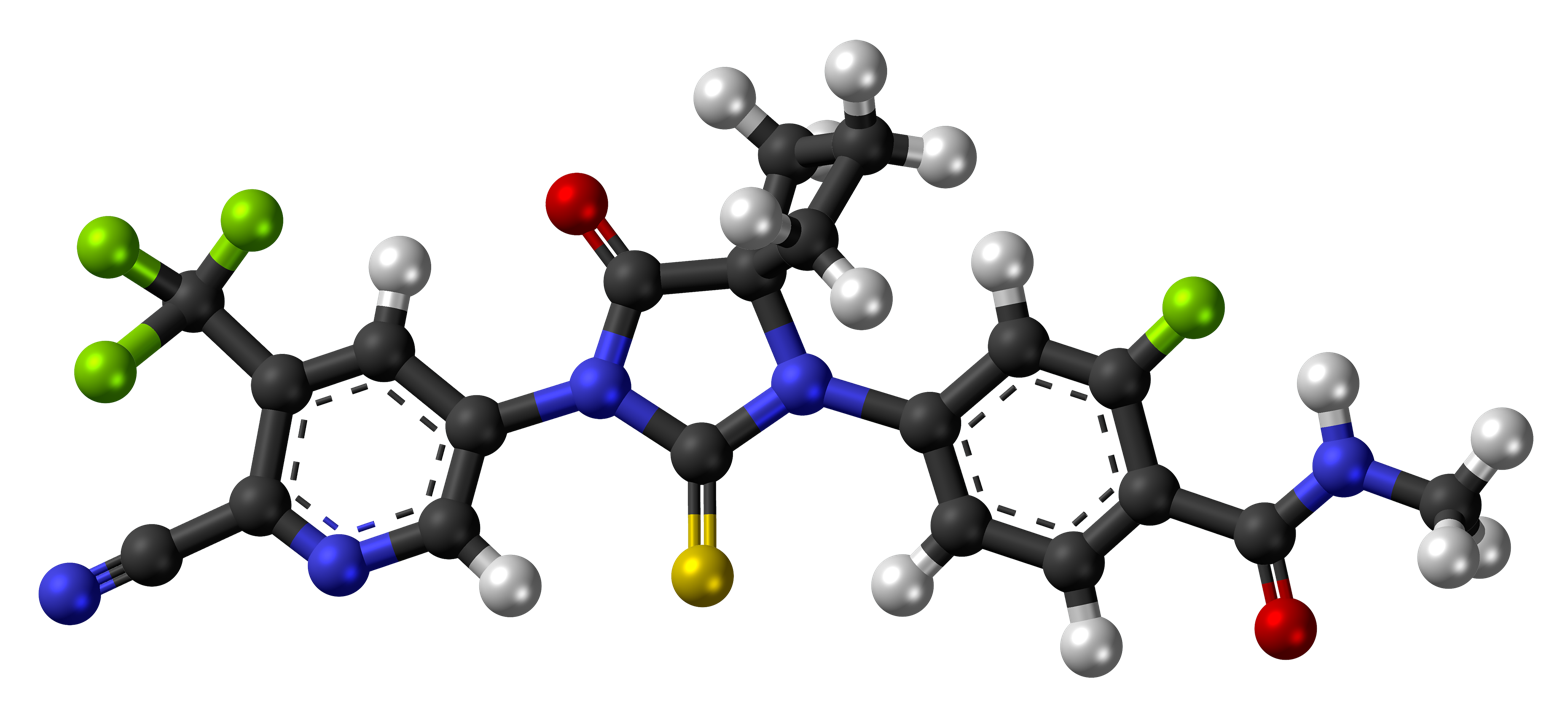

Clinical data
- Trade names: Erleada, others
- Other names: ARN-509; JNJ-56021927; JNJ-927; A52
- AHFS/Drugs.com: Monograph
- MedlinePlus: a618018
- License data: US DailyMed: Erleada
- Pregnancy category: AU: D
- Routes of administration: By mouth
- Drug class: Nonsteroidal antiandrogen
- ATC code: L02BB05 (WHO)

Legal status
- Legal status: AU: S4 (Prescription only); CA: ℞-only; UK: POM (Prescription only); US: ℞-only; EU: Rx-only; In general: ℞ (Prescription only)

Pharmacokinetic data
- Bioavailability: 100%
- Protein binding: Apalutamide: 96% NDMA: 95%
- Metabolism: Liver (CYP2C8, CYP3A4)
- Metabolites: • NDMA
- Elimination half-life: Apalutamide: 3–4 days (at steady-state)
- Excretion: Urine: 65% Feces: 24%

Identifiers
- IUPAC name: 4-[7-[6-cyano-5-(trifluoromethyl)pyridin-3-yl]-8-oxo-6-sulfanylidene-5,7-diazaspiro[3.4]octan-5-yl]-2-fluoro-N-methylbenzamide
- CAS Number: 956104-40-8; 1361232-32-7
- PubChem CID: 24872560
- DrugBank: DB11901
- ChemSpider: 28424131
- UNII: 4T36H88UA7
- KEGG: D11040
- ChEMBL: ChEMBL3183409
- CompTox Dashboard (EPA): DTXSID40241899
- ECHA InfoCard: 100.235.115

Chemical and physical data
- Formula: C_{21}H_{15}F_{4}N_{5}O_{2}S
- Molar mass: 477.44 g·mol^{−1}
- 3D model (JSmol): Interactive image
- SMILES: CNC(=O)C1=C(C=C(C=C1)N2C(=S)N(C(=O)C23CCC3)C4=CN=C(C(=C4)C(F)(F)F)C#N)F
- InChI: InChI=1S/C21H15F4N5O2S/c1-27-17(31)13-4-3-11(8-15(13)22)30-19(33)29(18(32)20(30)5-2-6-20)12-7-14(21(23,24)25)16(9-26)28-10-12/h3-4,7-8,10H,2,5-6H2,1H3,(H,27,31); Key:HJBWBFZLDZWPHF-UHFFFAOYSA-N

Apalutamide, sold under the brand name Erleada among others, is a nonsteroidal antiandrogen (NSAA) medication used for the treatment of prostate cancer. It is an androgen receptor inhibitor. It is taken by mouth.

Side effects of apalutamide when added to castration include fatigue, nausea, abdominal pain, diarrhea, high blood pressure, rash, falls, bone fractures, and an underactive thyroid. Rarely, it can cause seizures. The medication has a high potential for drug interactions. Apalutamide is an antiandrogen, and acts as an antagonist of the androgen receptor, the biological target of androgens like testosterone and dihydrotestosterone. In doing so, it prevents the effects of these hormones in the prostate gland and elsewhere in the body.

Apalutamide was first described in 2007, and was approved for the treatment of prostate cancer in February 2018. It is the first medication to be approved specifically for the treatment of non-metastatic castration-resistant prostate cancer.

== Medical uses ==
Apalutamide is indicated for the treatment of people with metastatic castration-sensitive prostate cancer and the treatment of people with non-metastatic castration-resistant prostate cancer.

Apalutamide is used in conjunction with castration, either via bilateral orchiectomy or gonadotropin-releasing hormone analogue (GnRH analogue) therapy, as a method of androgen deprivation therapy in the treatment of non-metastatic castration-resistant prostate cancer. It is also a promising potential treatment for metastatic castration-resistant prostate cancer (mCRPC), which the NSAA enzalutamide and the androgen synthesis inhibitor abiraterone acetate are used to treat.

== Contraindications ==
Contraindications of apalutamide include pregnancy and a history of or susceptibility to seizures.

== Side effects ==
Apalutamide has been found to be well tolerated in clinical trials, with the most common side effects reported when added to surgical or medical castration including fatigue, nausea, abdominal pain, and diarrhea. Other side effects have included rash, falls and bone fractures, and hypothyroidism, as well as seizures (in 0.2%), among others. Apalutamide is an expected teratogen and has a theoretical risk of birth defects in male infants if taken by women during pregnancy. It may impair male fertility. When used as a monotherapy (i.e., without surgical or medical castration) in men, NSAAs are known to produce additional, estrogenic side effects like breast tenderness, gynecomastia, and feminization in general by increasing estradiol levels. Similarly to the related second-generation NSAA enzalutamide but unlike first-generation NSAAs like flutamide and bicalutamide, elevated liver enzymes and hepatotoxicity have not been reported with apalutamide. Case reports of rare interstitial lung disease with apalutamide exist similarly to with first-generation NSAAs however.

== Overdose ==
There is no known antidote for overdose of apalutamide. General supportive measures should be undertaken until clinical toxicity, if any, diminishes or resolves.

== Interactions ==
Apalutamide has a high potential for drug interactions. In terms of effects of apalutamide on other drugs, the exposure of substrates of CYP3A4, CYP2C19, CYP2C9, UDP-glucuronosyltransferase, P-glycoprotein, ABCG2, or OATP1B1 may be reduced to varying extents. In terms of effects of other drugs on apalutamide, strong CYP2C8 or CYP3A4 inhibitors may increase levels of apalutamide or its major active metabolite N-desmethylapalutamide, while mild to moderate CYP2C8 or CYP3A4 inhibitors are not expected to affect their exposure.

== Pharmacology ==
=== Pharmacodynamics ===
==== Antiandrogenic activity ====
Apalutamide acts as a selective competitive silent antagonist of the androgen receptor (AR), via the ligand-binding domain, and hence is an antiandrogen. It is similar both structurally and pharmacologically to the second-generation NSAA enzalutamide, but shows some advantages, including higher antiandrogenic activity as well as several-fold reduced central nervous system distribution. The latter difference may reduce its comparative risk of seizures and other central side effects. Apalutamide has 5- to 10-fold greater affinity for the AR than bicalutamide, a first-generation NSAA.

The acquired F876L mutation of the AR identified in advanced prostate cancer cells has been found to confer resistance to both enzalutamide and apalutamide. A newer NSAA, darolutamide, is not affected by this mutation, nor has it been found to be affected by any other tested/well-known AR mutations. Apalutamide may be effective in a subset of prostate cancer patients with acquired resistance to abiraterone acetate.

==== Other activities ====
Apalutamide shows potent induction potential of cytochrome P450 enzymes similarly to enzalutamide. It is a strong inducer of CYP3A4 and CYP2C19 and a weak inducer of CYP2C9, as well as an inducer of UDP-glucuronosyltransferase. In addition, apalutamide is an inducer of P-glycoprotein, ABCG2, and OATP1B1.

Apalutamide binds weakly to and inhibits the GABA_{A} receptor in vitro similarly to enzalutamide (IC_{50} = 3.0 and 2.7 μM, respectively), but due to its relatively lower central concentrations, may have a lower risk of seizures in comparison.

Apalutamide has been found to significantly and concentration-dependently increase QT interval.

=== Pharmacokinetics ===
The mean absolute oral bioavailability of apalutamide is 100%. Mean peak levels of apalutamide occur 2 hours following administration, with a range of 1 to 5 hours. Food delays the median time to peak levels of apalutamide by approximately 2 hours, with no significant changes in the peak levels themselves or in area-under-curve levels. Steady-state levels of apalutamide are achieved following 4 weeks of administration, with an approximate 5-fold accumulation. Peak concentrations for 160 mg/day apalutamide at steady-state are 6.0 μg/mL (12.5 μmol/L), relative to peak levels of 16.6 μg/mL (35.7 μmol/L) for 160 mg/day enzalutamide and mean (R)-bicalutamide levels of 21.6 μg/mL (50.2 μmol/L) for 150 mg/day bicalutamide. The mean volume of distribution of apalutamide at steady-state is approximately 276 L. The plasma protein binding of apalutamide is 96%, while that of its major metabolite N-desmethylapalutamide is 95%, both irrespective of concentration.

Apalutamide is metabolized in the liver by CYP2C8 and CYP3A4. A major active metabolite, N-desmethylapalutamide, is formed by these enzymes, with similar contribution of each of these enzymes to its formation at steady-state. Following a single oral dose of 200 mg apalutamide, apalutamide represented 45% and N-desmethylapalutamide 44% of total area-under-curve levels. The mean elimination half-life of apalutamide at steady-state is 3 to 4 days. Fluctuations in apalutamide exposure are low and levels are stable throughout the day, with mean peak-to-trough ratios of 1.63 for apalutamide and 1.27–1.3 for N-desmethylapalutamide. After a single dose of apalutamide, its clearance rate (CL/F) was 1.3 L/h, while its clearance rate increased to 2.0 L/h at steady-state. This change is considered to be likely due to CYP3A4 auto-induction. Approximately 65% of apalutamide is excreted in urine (1.2% as unchanged apalutamide and 2.7% as N-desmethylapalutamide) while 24% is excreted in feces (1.5% as unchanged apalutamide and 2% as N-desmethylapalutamide).

== Chemistry ==
Apalutamide is a structural analogue of enzalutamide and RD-162. It is a pyridyl variant of RD-162. Enzalutamide and RD-162 were derived from the nonsteroidal androgen RU-59063, which itself was derived from the first-generation NSAA nilutamide and by extension from flutamide.

Chemical structures of apalutamide and its predecessors
Flutamide

Nilutamide

RU-59063

Enzalutamide

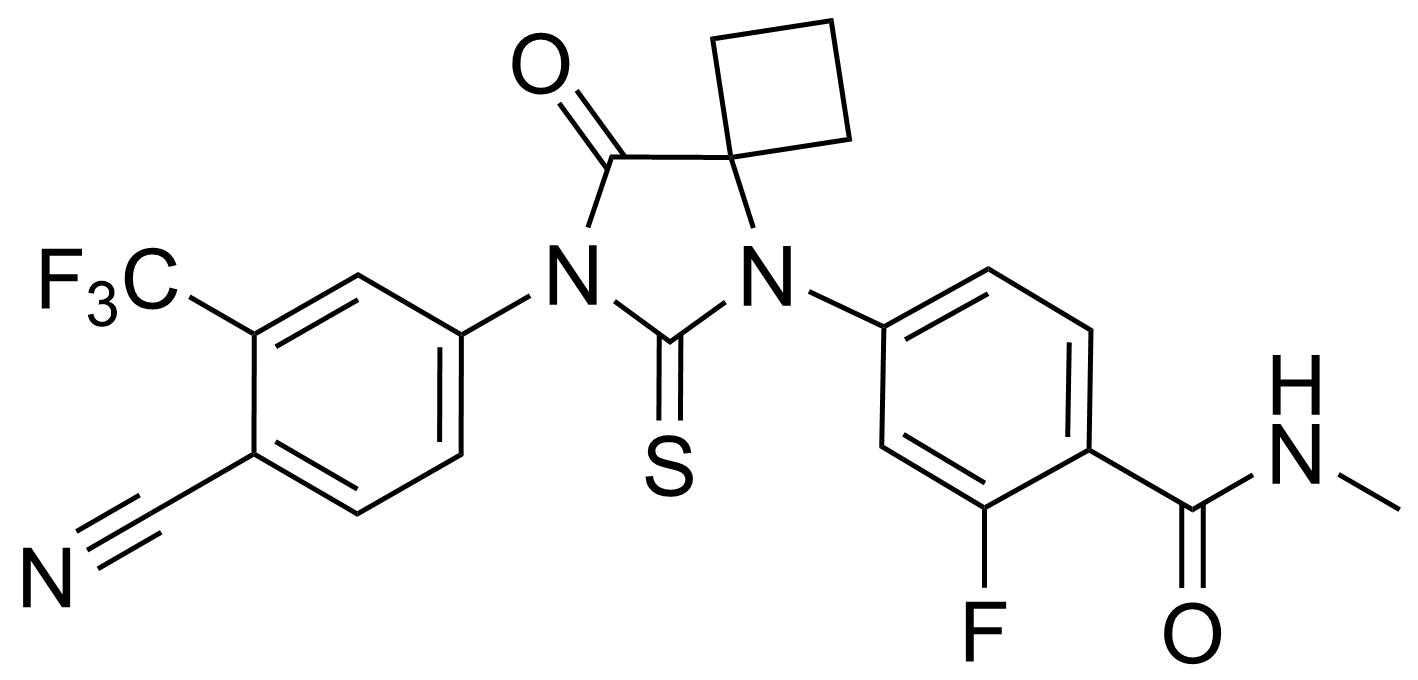
RD-162

Apalutamide

=== Synthesis ===
The chemical synthesis of apalutamide has been described. Also see:

skin-invert-image

The bromination of 2-hydroxy-5-nitro-3-(trifluoromethyl)pyridine [99368-66-8] (1) with POBr3 gave 2-bromo-5-nitro-3-(trifluoromethyl)pyridine [956104-42-0] (2). A cyanation using sodium cyanide and copper(I)iodide in butyronitrile provided 5-nitro-3-trifluoromethylpyridine-2-carbonitrile [573762-57-9] (3). Chemoselective reduction of the nitro group involved a catalyst slurry (H3PO2, Pt/C, NH4VO3) in xylenes and butyronitrile under a hydrogen atmosphere to give 5-amino-3-(trifluoromethyl)pyridine-2-carbonitrile [573762-62-6] (4). A telescoped CDI mediated coupling reaction with Boc-cyclovaline [120728-10-1] (5) yielded amide, PC121422675 (6). Boc cleavage using HCl in IPA gave 1-amino-N-[6-cyano-5-(trifluoromethyl)-3-pyridyl]cyclobutanecarboxamide [1950587-17-3] (7). An Ullman-type coupling with 4-bromo-2-fluoro-N-methylbenzamide [749927-69-3] (8) gave [1950587-20-8] (9). Lastly, exposure to 1,1'-thiocarbonyldi-2(1H)-pyridone [102368-13-8] (10) and DMAP in warm DMA provided apalutamide (11).

== History ==
Apalutamide was originated by the University of California system and was developed primarily by Janssen Research & Development, a division of Johnson & Johnson. It was first described in the literature in a United States patent application that was published in November 2007 and in another that was submitted in July 2010. A March 2012 publication described the discovery and development of apalutamide. A phase I clinical trial of apalutamide was completed by March 2012, and the results of this study were published in 2013. Information on phase III clinical studies, including ATLAS, SPARTAN, and TITAN, was published between 2014 and 2016. Positive results for phase III trials were first described in 2017, and Janssen submitted a New Drug Application for apalutamide to the United States Food and Drug Administration on 11 October 2017. Apalutamide was approved by the Food and Drug Administration in the United States, under the brand name Erleada, for the treatment of non-metastatic castration-resistant prostate cancer in February 2018. It was subsequently approved in Canada, the European Union, and Australia.

== Society and culture ==
=== Generic names ===
Apalutamide is the generic name of the medication and is its international nonproprietary name. It is also known by its developmental code names ARN-509 and JNJ-56021927.

=== Brand names ===
Apalutamide is marketed under the brand names Erleada and Erlyand.

=== Availability ===
Apalutamide is available in the United States, Canada, the European Union, and Australia.
