= EZH1 =

Protein-coding gene in the species Homo sapiens

Identifiers
- Aliases: EZH1, KMT6B, enhancer of zeste 1 polycomb repressive complex 2 subunit
- External IDs: OMIM: 601674; MGI: 1097695; GeneCards: EZH1
Enzyme activity
EC #	BRENDA	ExPASy	KEGG	MetaCyc
2.1.1.356	↗	↗	↗	↗

Gene location (Human)
Chr.	Chromosome 17 (human)
Band	17q21.2	Start	42,700,275 bp
Band	17q21.2	End	42,745,049 bp

Gene location (Mouse)
Chr.	Chromosome 11 (mouse)
Band	11 D|11 64.37 cM	Start	101,081,941 bp
Band	11 D|11 64.37 cM	End	101,117,289 bp
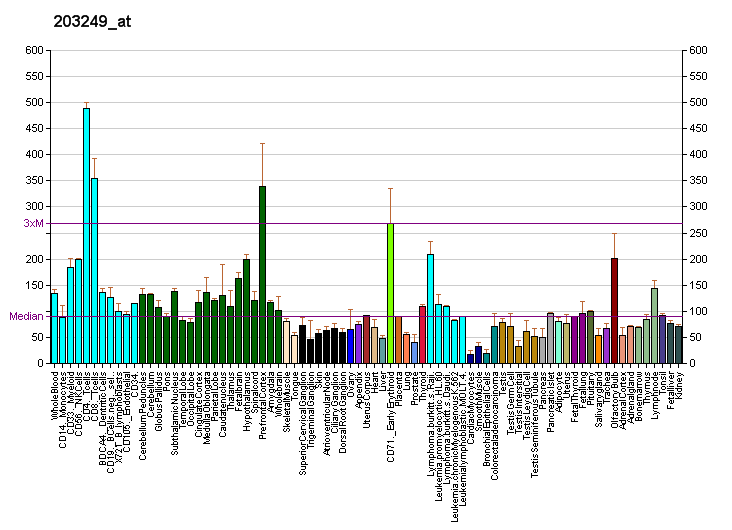

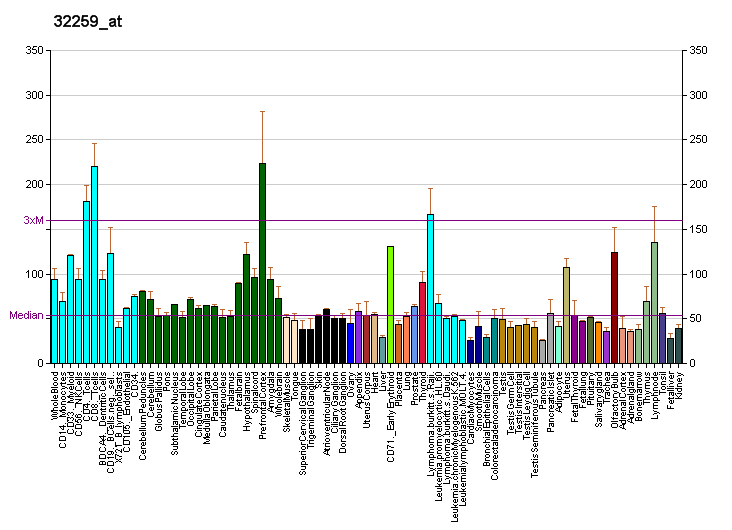
RNA expression pattern
Bgee	Human / Mouse (ortholog); Top expressed in: cerebellar hemisphere; right hemisphere of cerebellum; tibial nerve; dorsal motor nucleus of vagus nerve; Achilles tendon; left ovary; sural nerve; olfactory bulb; right ovary; canal of the cervix / Top expressed in: ciliary body; iris; motor neuron; retinal pigment epithelium; ankle; zygote; vestibular membrane of cochlear duct; dentate gyrus of hippocampal formation granule cell; granulocyte; neural layer of retina; More reference expression data
BioGPS	More reference expression data
Gene ontology
Molecular function	methyltransferase activity; transferase activity; chromatin binding; histone-lysine N-methyltransferase activity; DNA-binding transcription factor activity, RNA polymerase II-specific; DNA binding; transcription corepressor activity
Cellular component	ESC/E(Z) complex; nucleus; nucleoplasm; telomere
Biological process	histone H3-K27 methylation; anatomical structure morphogenesis; methylation; regulation of transcription, DNA-templated; hippocampus development; transcription, DNA-templated; positive regulation of transcription by RNA polymerase II; chromatin organization; negative regulation of transcription by RNA polymerase II; chromatin remodeling
Sources:Amigo / QuickGO
Orthologs
Databases	NCBI: entry; OMA: entry
Species	Human	Mouse
Entrez	2145	14055
Ensembl	ENSG00000108799	ENSMUSG00000006920
UniProt	Q92800	P70351
RefSeq (mRNA)	NM_001991; NM_001321079; NM_001321081; NM_001321082	NM_007970
RefSeq (protein)	NP_001308008; NP_001308010; NP_001308011; NP_001982	NP_031996; NP_001390736; NP_001390738; NP_001390739; NP_001390740 NP_001390741; NP_001390742; NP_001390743; NP_001390744; NP_001390745; NP_001390747; NP_001390750; NP_001390751
Location (UCSC)	Chr 17: 42.7 – 42.75 Mb	Chr 11: 101.08 – 101.12 Mb
PubMed search
- Wikidata
View/Edit Human	View/Edit Mouse

Histone-lysine N-methyltransferase EZH1 is an enzyme that in humans is encoded by the EZH1 gene.

== Function ==
In mice, EZH1 and EZH2 cogovern histone H3K27 trimethylation and are essential for hair follicle homeostasis and wound repair. EZH1 also complements EZH2 in maintaining stem cell identity and executing pluripotency.
