= Enzalutamide =

Antiandrogen medication used in treatment of prostate cancer

Clinical data
- Trade names: Xtandi
- Other names: MDV-3100; ASP-9785
- AHFS/Drugs.com: Monograph
- MedlinePlus: a612033
- License data: US DailyMed: Enzalutamide
- Pregnancy category: AU: X (High risk)
- Routes of administration: By mouth
- Drug class: Nonsteroidal antiandrogen
- ATC code: L02BB04 (WHO)

Legal status
- Legal status: AU: S4 (Prescription only); CA: ℞-only; US: ℞-only; EU: Rx-only

Pharmacokinetic data
- Bioavailability: Rats: 89.7% Humans: unknown (but at least 84.6% based on recovery from excretion)
- Protein binding: Enzalutamide: 97–98% (primarily to albumin); NDME: 95%
- Metabolism: Liver (primarily CYP2C8 and CYP3A4)
- Metabolites: • NDME (active) • Carboxylic acid derivative metabolite (inactive)
- Elimination half-life: Enzalutamide: 5.8 days (range 2.8–10.2 days); NDME: 7.8–8.6 days
- Excretion: Urine: 71.0% Bile: 13.6% Feces: 0.39%

Identifiers
- IUPAC name: 4-{3-[4-cyano-3-(trifluoromethyl)phenyl]-5,5-dimethyl-4-oxo-2-sulfanylideneimidazolidin-1-yl}-2-fluoro-N-methylbenzamide
- CAS Number: 915087-33-1
- PubChem CID: 15951529
- IUPHAR/BPS: 6812
- DrugBank: DB08899
- ChemSpider: 13093347
- UNII: 93T0T9GKNU
- KEGG: D10218
- ChEBI: CHEBI:68534
- ChEMBL: ChEMBL1082407
- CompTox Dashboard (EPA): DTXSID10912307
- ECHA InfoCard: 100.231.722

Chemical and physical data
- Formula: C_{21}H_{16}F_{4}N_{4}O_{2}S
- Molar mass: 464.44 g·mol^{−1}
- 3D model (JSmol): Interactive image
- SMILES: CNC(=O)c1ccc(N2C(=S)N(c3ccc(C#N)c(C(F)(F)F)c3)C(=O)C2(C)C)cc1F
- InChI: InChI=1S/C21H16F4N4O2S/c1-20(2)18(31)28(12-5-4-11(10-26)15(8-12)21(23,24)25)19(32)29(20)13-6-7-14(16(22)9-13)17(30)27-3/h4-9H,1-3H3,(H,27,30); Key:WXCXUHSOUPDCQV-UHFFFAOYSA-N

Enzalutamide, sold under the brand name Xtandi, is a nonsteroidal antiandrogen (NSAA) medication which is used in the treatment of prostate cancer. It is indicated for use in conjunction with castration in the treatment of metastatic castration-resistant prostate cancer (mCRPC), nonmetastatic castration-resistant prostate cancer, and metastatic castration-sensitive prostate cancer (mCSPC). It is taken by mouth.

Side effects of enzalutamide when added to castration include asthenia, back pain, diarrhea, arthralgia, and hot flashes. Rarely, it can cause seizures. It has a high potential for drug interactions. Enzalutamide is an antiandrogen, and acts as an antagonist of the androgen receptor, the biological target of androgens like testosterone and dihydrotestosterone. In doing so, it prevents the effects of these hormones in the prostate gland and elsewhere in the body.

Enzalutamide was first described in 2006, and was introduced for the treatment of prostate cancer in 2012. It was the first second-generation NSAA to be introduced. Enzalutamide is a therapeutic alternative on the World Health Organization's List of Essential Medicines.

== Medical uses ==
Enzalutamide is indicated for the treatment of people with castration-resistant prostate cancer; metastatic castration-sensitive prostate cancer; and non‑metastatic castration‑sensitive prostate cancer with biochemical recurrence at high risk for metastasis.

=== Prostate cancer ===
There is good evidence that enzalutamide is an effective treatment for increasing overall survival among people with high-risk non-metastatic castration-resistant prostate cancer, particularly those with a PSA doubling time ≤ 6 months.

=== Other uses ===
Enzalutamide can be used as an antiandrogen in feminizing hormone therapy for transgender women.

=== Available forms ===
Enzalutamide is provided as a capsule or tablet.

== Contraindications ==
Enzalutamide is contraindicated in women during pregnancy. It may cause fetal harm.

== Side effects ==
Notable side effects of enzalutamide seen in clinical trials have included gynecomastia, breast pain/tenderness, fatigue, diarrhea, hot flashes, headache, sexual dysfunction, and, less commonly, seizures. Other "common" side effects reported in clinical trials have included neutropenia, visual hallucinations, anxiety, cognitive disorder, memory impairment, hypertension, dry skin, and pruritus (itching). Enzalutamide monotherapy is regarded as having a moderate negative effect on sexual function and activity, significantly less than that of GnRH analogues but similar to that of other NSAAs such as bicalutamide.

=== Central adverse effects ===
Seizures have occurred in approximately 1% of patients treated with enzalutamide in clinical trials. This is thought to be due to enzalutamide crossing the blood–brain barrier and exerting off-target binding to and inhibition of the GABA_{A} receptor in the central nervous system (it has been found to inhibit the GABA_{A} receptor in vitro (IC_{50} = 3.6 μM) and induces convulsions in animals at high doses). In addition to seizures, other potentially GABA_{A} receptor-related side effects observed with enzalutamide treatment in clinical trials have included anxiety, insomnia, vertigo, paresthesia, and headache. Due to its ability to lower the seizure threshold, patients with known seizure disorders or brain injury should be closely monitored during enzalutamide treatment. NSAA-induced seizures are responsive to benzodiazepine treatment, and it has been suggested that GABA_{A} receptor inhibition by enzalutamide could be treated with these drugs. In dose-ranging studies, severe fatigue was observed with enzalutamide at doses of 240 mg/day and above.

=== Rare adverse reactions ===
There is a single case report of posterior reversible encephalopathy syndrome (PRES) with enzalutamide treatment. The mechanism of action of the side effect is unknown, but it was proposed to a consequence of inhibition of the GABA_{A} receptor by enzalutamide.

== Overdose ==
Enzalutamide may cause seizures in overdose.

== Interactions ==
Enzalutamide is a moderate to strong inducer of multiple cytochrome P450 enzymes including CYP3A4, CYP2C9, and CYP2C19 and hence has a high potential for clinically relevant drug interactions. Circulating concentrations of enzalutamide may be altered by inhibitors and inducers of CYP2C8 and CYP3A4, and should be avoided if possible.

In a clinical study of enzalutamide for ER-positive breast cancer in women, enzalutamide was found to decrease serum concentrations of the aromatase inhibitors anastrozole and exemestane by 90% and 50%, respectively, which could reduce their effectiveness.

== Pharmacology ==
=== Pharmacodynamics ===
Enzalutamide acts as a selective silent antagonist of the androgen receptor (AR), the biological target of androgens like testosterone and dihydrotestosterone (DHT). Unlike the first-generation NSAA bicalutamide, enzalutamide does not promote translocation of AR to the cell nucleus and in addition prevents binding of AR to deoxyribonucleic acid (DNA) and AR to coactivator proteins. As such, it has been described as an AR signaling inhibitor in addition to antagonist. The drug is described as a "second-generation" NSAA because it has greatly increased efficacy as an antiandrogen relative to so-called "first-generation" NSAAs like flutamide and bicalutamide. The drug has only 2-fold lower affinity for the AR than DHT, the endogenous ligand of the AR in the prostate gland.

When LNCaP cells (a prostate cancer cell line) engineered to express elevated levels of AR (as found in patients with advanced prostate cancer) were treated with enzalutamide, the expression of androgen-dependent genes PSA and TMPRSS2 was down regulated in contrast to bicalutamide where the expression was upregulated. In VCaP cells which over-express the AR, enzalutamide induced apoptosis whereas bicalutamide did not. Furthermore, enzalutamide behaves as an antagonist of the W741C mutant AR in contrast to bicalutamide which behaves as a pure agonist when bound to the W741C mutant.

Dose-ranging studies of enzalutamide in men with prostate cancer have been performed.

==== Changes in hormone levels ====
Enzalutamide monotherapy at a dosage of 160 mg/day has been found to increase circulating levels of testosterone by 114.3%, dihydrotestosterone (DHT) by 51.7%, estradiol by 71.7%, sex hormone-binding globulin (SHBG) by 100.6%, dehydroepiandrosterone (DHEA) by 9.6%, androstenedione by 51.1%, luteinizing hormone (LH) by 184.7%, follicle-stimulating hormone (FSH) by 47.0%, and prolactin by 16.8%. These changes in hormone levels are similar to those with high-dose bicalutamide monotherapy. The median maximum decrease in levels of prostate-specific antigen (PSA) levels was 99.6%.

==== Comparison with other antiandrogens ====
Enzalutamide has approximately 8-fold higher binding affinity for the androgen receptor (AR) compared to bicalutamide. One study found an IC_{50} of 21 nM for enzalutamide and 160 nM for bicalutamide at the AR in the LNCaP cell line (7.6-fold difference), while another found respective IC_{50} values of 36 nM and 159 nM (4.4-fold difference). In accordance, clinical findings suggest that enzalutamide is a significantly more potent and effective antiandrogen in comparison to first-generation NSAAs such as bicalutamide, flutamide, and nilutamide. Also, unlike with the first-generation NSAAs, there has been no evidence of hepatotoxicity or elevated liver enzymes in association with enzalutamide treatment in clinical trials.

==== Resistance mechanisms in prostate cancer ====
Enzalutamide is only effective for a certain period of time, after that the growth of the cancer is not inhibited by this antiandrogen. The mechanisms of resistance to Enzalutamide are being intensively studied. Currently, several mechanisms have been found:

- AR mutations
- AR splice variants
- Glucocorticoid receptor bypass
- Increase in flux of glycolysis
- Autophagy mediated resistance
- Wnt signaling activation
- Increase in intra-tumoral androgen biosynthesis mediated by AKR1C3 enzyme
- Interleukin 6 signaling mediated resistance

==== Cytochrome P450 modulation ====
Enzalutamide is reported to be a strong inducer of the enzyme CYP3A4 and a moderate inducer of CYP2C9 and CYP2C19, and can affect the circulating concentrations of drugs that are metabolized by these enzymes.

=== Pharmacokinetics ===
The bioavailability of enzalutamide in humans is unknown, but is at least 84.6% based on the amount recovered from urine and bile in excretion studies. Similarly, the bioavailability of enzalutamide in rats is 89.7%. Steady-state concentrations of enzalutamide are achieved within 28 days of treatment initiation. The plasma protein binding of enzalutamide is 97 to 98%, while that of N-desmethylenzalutamide (NDME), its major metabolite, is 95%. Enzalutamide is primarily bound to albumin. The medication is metabolized in the liver, mainly by the cytochrome P450 enzymes CYP2C8 and CYP3A4. CYP2C8 is primarily responsible for the formation of NDME. Enzalutamide has a long elimination half-life of 5.8 days on average, with a range of 2.8 to 10.2 days. The elimination half-life of NDME is even longer, at about 7.8 to 8.6 days. Enzalutamide is eliminated 71.0% in urine, 13.6% in bile, and 0.39% in feces.

== Chemistry ==
Enzalutamide is a synthetic diaryl thiohydantoin derivative and is structurally related to the earlier first-generation NSAAs such as flutamide, nilutamide, and bicalutamide as well as to newer second-generation NSAAs like apalutamide and proxalutamide.

== History ==
Enzalutamide was discovered by Charles Sawyers and Michael Jung at the University of California, Los Angeles. They and their colleagues synthesized and evaluated nearly 200 thiohydantoin derivatives of RU-59063, an analogue of nilutamide, for AR antagonism in human prostate cancer cells, and identified enzalutamide and RD-162 as lead compounds. These compounds were patented in 2006 and described in 2007. Enzalutamide was developed and marketed by Medivation for the treatment of prostate cancer. It was approved by the US Food and Drug Administration (FDA) for the treatment of mCRPC in the United States in August 2012, and for the treatment of nonmetastatic castration-resistant prostate cancer in July 2018. Enzalutamide was the first new AR antagonist to be approved for the treatment of prostate cancer in over 15 years, following the introduction of the first-generation NSAA bicalutamide in 1995. It was the first second-generation NSAA to be introduced.

In July 2018, the FDA approved enzalutamide for the treatment of people with castration-resistant prostate cancer. The approval broadens the indication to include people with both non-metastatic castration-resistant prostate cancer and metastatic castration-resistant prostate cancer. Enzalutamide was previously approved for the treatment of people with metastatic castration-resistant prostate cancer.

In December 2019, the FDA approved enzalutamide for the treatment of people with metastatic castration-sensitive prostate cancer (mCSPC). Enzalutamide was previously approved for the treatment of people with castration-resistant prostate cancer.

In June 2023, the FDA approved talazoparib, in combination with enzalutamide, for the treatment of people with homologous recombination repair (HRR) gene-mutated metastatic castration-resistant prostate cancer (mCRPC).

In November 2023, the FDA approved enzalutamide for the treatment of people with non-metastatic castration-sensitive prostate cancer with biochemical recurrence at high risk for metastasis (high-risk BCR). Efficacy was evaluated in EMBARK (NCT02319837), a randomized, controlled clinical trial of 1068 patients with nmCSPC with high-risk BCR. All patients had prior definitive therapy with radical prostatectomy and/or radiotherapy with curative intent, had PSA doubling time ≤ 9 months, and were not candidates for salvage radiotherapy at enrollment. Patients were randomized 1:1:1 to receive blinded enzalutamide 160 mg once daily plus leuprolide, open-label single- agent enzalutamide 160 mg once daily, or blinded placebo once daily plus leuprolide. The application was granted priority review and fast track designations.

== Society and culture ==
=== Legal status ===
In June 2024, the Committee for Medicinal Products for Human Use of the European Medicines Agency adopted a positive opinion, recommending the granting of a marketing authorization for the medicinal product Enzalutamide Viatris, intended for the treatment of prostate cancer. The applicant for this medicinal product is Viatris Limited. Enzalutamide Viatris is a generic of Xtandi.

=== Economics ===
Pfizer reported revenue of US$1.191 billion for Xtandi in 2023.

== Research ==
=== Breast cancer ===
Research suggests that enzalutamide may be effective in the treatment of certain types of breast cancer in women. It has been tested for the treatment of triple-negative, AR-positive breast cancer in a phase II clinical trial.

=== Hirsutism ===
Enzalutamide has been suggested as a potential treatment for hirsutism and hyperandrogenism in women with polyendocrine metabolic ovarian syndrome (PMOS).

== See also ==
- Mevrometostat
