= C24H31NO =

The molecular formula C_{24}H_{31}NO (molar mass: 349.51 g/mol, exact mass: 349.2406 u) may refer to:

- AB-001 (1-pentyl-3-(1-adamantoyl)indole)
- Abiraterone
- 3-Keto-5α-abiraterone
- Dipipanone
