= Seviteronel =

Chemical compound

Clinical data
- Other names: VT-464; INO-464
- Routes of administration: By mouth
- Drug class: Androgen biosynthesis inhibitor; Nonsteroidal antiandrogen
- ATC code: None

Identifiers
- IUPAC name: (1S)-1-[6,7-Bis(difluoromethoxy)naphthalen-2-yl]-2-methyl-1-(2H-triazol-4-yl)propan-1-ol
- CAS Number: 1610537-15-9
- PubChem CID: 78357816
- ChemSpider: 32738723
- UNII: 8S5OIN36X4
- CompTox Dashboard (EPA): DTXSID401025651

Chemical and physical data
- Formula: C_{18}H_{17}F_{4}N_{3}O_{3}
- Molar mass: 399.346 g·mol^{−1}
- 3D model (JSmol): Interactive image
- SMILES: CC(C)C(C1=CC2=CC(=C(C=C2C=C1)OC(F)F)OC(F)F)(C3=NNN=C3)O
- InChI: InChI=1S/C18H17F4N3O3/c1-9(2)18(26,15-8-23-25-24-15)12-4-3-10-6-13(27-16(19)20)14(28-17(21)22)7-11(10)5-12/h3-9,16-17,26H,1-2H3,(H,23,24,25)/t18-/m0/s1; Key:ZBRAJOQFSNYJMF-SFHVURJKSA-N

Seviteronel (developmental codes VT-464 and, formerly, INO-464) is an experimental cancer medication which is under development by Viamet Pharmaceuticals and Innocrin Pharmaceuticals for the treatment of prostate cancer and breast cancer. It is a nonsteroidal CYP17A1 inhibitor and works by inhibiting the production of androgens and estrogens in the body. As of July 2017, seviteronel is in phase II clinical trials for both prostate cancer and breast cancer. In January 2016, it was designated fast-track status by the United States Food and Drug Administration for prostate cancer. In April 2017, seviteronel received fast-track designation for breast cancer as well.

== Pharmacology ==
=== Pharmacodynamics ===
Seviteronel is a nonsteroidal antiandrogen, acting specifically as an androgen synthesis inhibitor via inhibition of the enzyme CYP17A1, for the treatment of castration-resistant prostate cancer. It has approximately 10-fold selectivity for the inhibition of 17,20-lyase (IC_{50} = 69 nM) over 17α-hydroxylase (IC_{50} = 670 nM), which results in less interference with corticosteroid production relative to the approved CYP17A1 inhibitor abiraterone acetate (which must be administered in combination with prednisone to avoid glucocorticoid deficiency and mineralocorticoid excess due to 17α-hydroxylase inhibition) and hence may be administerable without a concomitant exogenous glucocorticoid. Seviteronel is 58-fold more selective for inhibition of 17,20-lyase than abiraterone (the active metabolite of abiraterone acetate), which has IC_{50} values for inhibition of 17,20-lyase and 17α-hydroxylase of 15 nM and 2.5 nM, respectively. In addition, in in vitro models, seviteronel appears to possess greater efficacy as an antiandrogen relative to abiraterone. Similarly to abiraterone acetate, seviteronel has also been found to act to some extent as an antagonist of the androgen receptor.

== Society and culture ==
=== Generic names ===
Seviteronel is the generic name of the drug and its INN.

== See also ==
- List of investigational sex-hormonal agents § Androgenics
