= Estrogen synthesis inhibitor =

Drug class

An estrogen synthesis inhibitor is a type of drug which inhibits the enzymatic synthesis of estrogens, such as estradiol. They include:

Types of estrogen synthesis inhibitors
Class	Target	Action
Aromatase inhibitors	CYP19A1	inhibit the synthesis of estrogens from androgens
CYP17A1 inhibitors	17α-hydroxylase/17,20-lyase	inhibit the synthesis of androgens and therefore estrogens
3β-Hydroxysteroid dehydrogenase inhibitors	3β-HSD	inhibit the synthesis of progestogens and of more-potent androgens, thereby inhibiting the synthesis of estrogens
Cholesterol side-chain cleavage enzyme inhibitors	P450SCC/CYP11A1	inhibit the synthesis of pregnenolone from cholesterol, thereby inhibiting the synthesis of most steroid hormones (which are derived from pregnenolone) including estrogens
17β-Hydroxysteroid dehydrogenase inhibitors	17β-HSD	inhibit the interconversion of estrogens, including the synthesis of estradiol from the less-potent estrone
Steroid sulfatase inhibitors	STS	inhibit the conversion of inactive estrogen sulfates into active estrogens like estradiol

Inhibitors of cholesterol synthesis can also reduce estrogen production by inhibiting cholesterol production.

Estrogen synthesis inhibitors have medical applications in the treatment of breast cancer, precocious puberty, gynecomastia, and hyperestrogenism, among other estrogen-dependent conditions.

== See also ==
- Steroidogenesis inhibitor
- Androgen synthesis inhibitor
- Progesterone synthesis inhibitor
