= Romanno Bridge =

2008 novel by Andrew Greig

- Author: Andrew Greig
- Language: English
- Genre: Novel
- Publisher: Quercus
- Publication date: 2008
- Publication place: Scotland
- Media type: Print (Hardback)
- Pages: 312 pp
- ISBN: 978-1-84724-315-7
- OCLC: 181422992
- Dewey Decimal: 823/.914 22
- LC Class: PR6057.R388 R66 2008

Romanno Bridge is a novel by Scottish writer Andrew Greig, first published by Quercus in 2008.

== Plot summary ==
The book is a sequel to Greig's second novel, The Return of John MacNab. It reunites the main characters from the previous book, and teams them with a half-Maori rugby player and a busker from Oslo, in a quest for the Stone of Scone. The action takes place mainly in Scotland, but it also includes sections set in Norway and England.

Like The Return of John MacNab, this novel is something of a homage to the stories of John Buchan, although the connection is not made explicit this time around.

== See also ==
- Novel in Scotland
