= C24H29NO =

The molecular formula C_{24}H_{29}NO may refer to:

- Δ^{4}-Abiraterone, a steroidogenesis inhibitor and active metabolite of abiraterone acetate
- Phenomorphan, an opioid analgesic
- Dexclamol
