= Cancer Research UK =

Cancer research and awareness charity

- Founded: 4 February 2002
- Type: Charitable organisation
- Registration no.: England and Wales: 1089464; Scotland: SC041666; Isle of Man: 1103
- Location: 2 Redman Place London E20 1JQ
- Coordinates: 51.5426°N 0.0119°W
- Fields: Cancer research Health policy
- Patron: King Charles III
- Presidents: The Duke of Gloucester; Princess Alexandra
- Key people: Michelle Mitchell (CEO); Charles Swanton (Chief Clinician); Ketan J. Patel (Chief Scientist)
- Revenue: £719 million (2022/23)
- Employees: 4,591 (2023)
- Volunteers: 25,000 (2023)
- Website: www.cancerresearchuk.org
- Formerly called: Imperial Cancer Research Fund (ICRF); The Cancer Research Campaign (CRC)

Cancer Research UK (CRUK) is the world's largest independent cancer research organisation. It is registered as a charity in the United Kingdom, as well as the Isle of Man, and was formed on 4 February 2002 by the merger of The Cancer Research Campaign and the Imperial Cancer Research Fund. Cancer Research UK conducts research using both its own staff and grant-funded researchers. It also provides information about cancer and runs campaigns aimed at raising awareness and influencing public policy. The organisation's work is almost entirely funded by the public. It raises money through donations, legacies, community fundraising, events, retail and corporate partnerships. Over 25,000 people are regular volunteers.

== History ==
The Imperial Cancer Research Fund (ICRF) was founded in 1902 as the Cancer Research Fund, changing its name to the Imperial Cancer Research Fund in 1904. It grew over the next twenty years to become one of the world's leading cancer research charities. Its executive committee was chaired by Sir William Church from its inception in 1902 until 1923. Its flagship laboratories formerly at Lincoln's Inn Fields, London, and Clare Hall, Hertfordshire, and known as the Cancer Research UK London Research Institute, are now part of the Francis Crick Institute.

The British Empire Cancer Campaign (BECC) was founded in 1923, and initially drew a hostile response from ICRF and the Medical Research Council, who considered it a rival. "The Campaign", as it was colloquially known, became a very successful and powerful grant-giving body. In 1970, the charity was renamed The Cancer Research Campaign (CRC).

Incorporated on 20 November 2001, the two organisations officially merged on 4 February 2002 to form Cancer Research UK, the largest independent cancer research organisation in the world (the largest, the National Cancer Institute, is funded by the US Government). At the time of the merger, the ICRF had an annual income of £124m, while the CRC had an income of £101m.

In June 2011, Cancer Research UK was one of several health charities (along with the British Heart Foundation, the Alzheimer's Society and Parkinson's UK) targeted by the animal rights organisation Animal Aid in a series of advertisements in British newspapers urging members of the public to stop giving donations to organisations that fund medical research involving animal experiments. In April 2017, the Information Commissioner's Office fined eleven charities that breached the Data Protection Act 1998 by misusing donors' personal data. Cancer Research UK was fined £16,000.

Based on article share during the period between January 2015 to August 2019, Nature listed Cancer Research UK in the top 150 of the Top 200 institutions in cancer research in the world. CRUK had an income of £718,793,138 and expenditure of £640,845,146 for the financial year ending in 31 March 2023. On 30 April 2024, King Charles III was announced as patron of the charity.

== Research ==
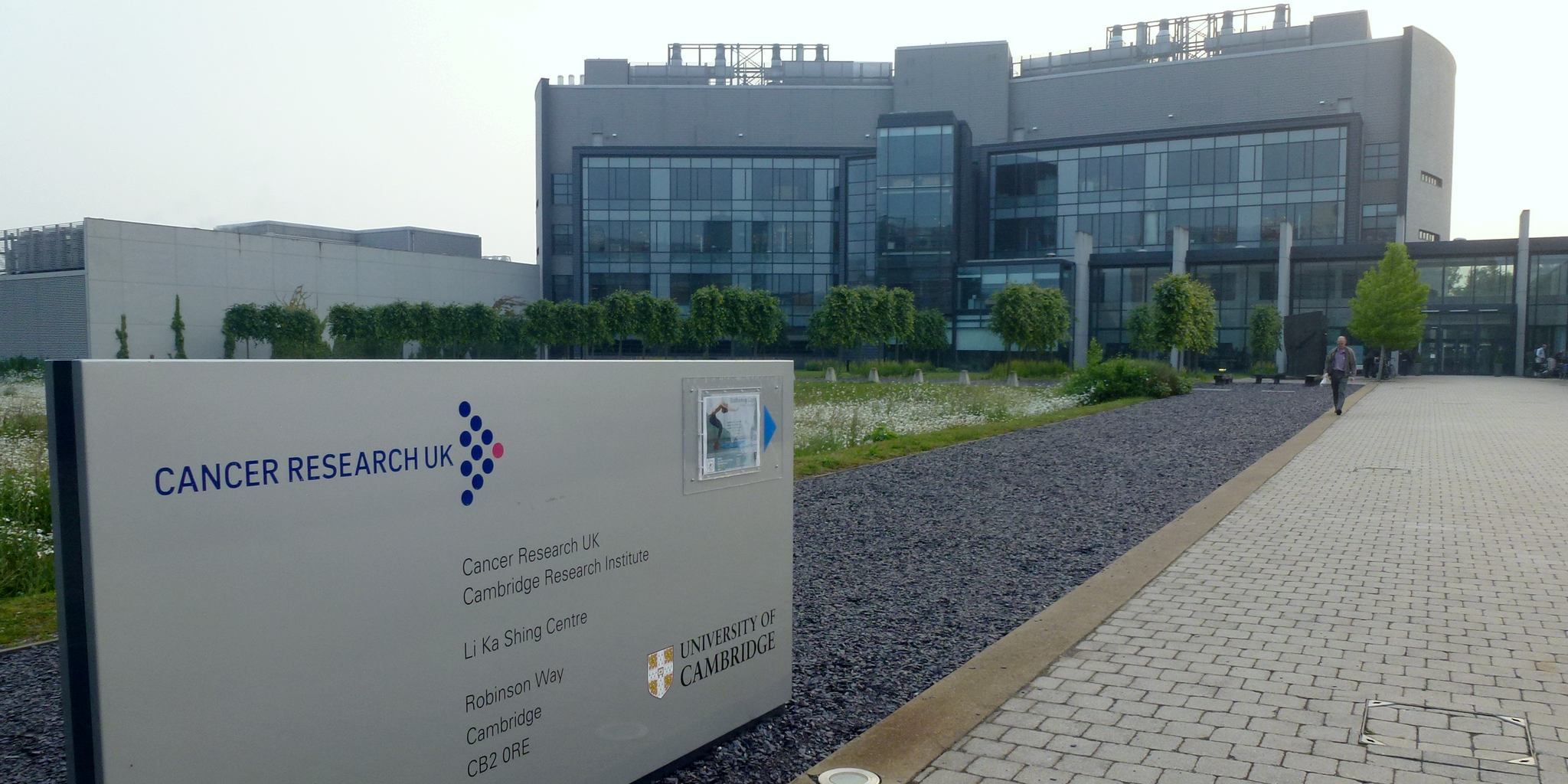
The Cancer Research UK Cambridge Research Institute

In the financial year 2014/15, the charity spent £422.67 million on cancer research projects (67% of its total income for that year). The bulk of the remaining costs were spent on trading and fundraising costs with a small amount spent on information services, campaigning, advocacy, administration and other activities or was held in reserve.

Around 40% of its research expenditure (27% of its total spending) is on basic laboratory research into the molecular basis of cancer. The remainder supports research into over 100 specific cancer types, focusing on drug discovery and development; prevention, early detection and imaging; surgery and radiotherapy; and cancers where survival rates are still low, such as oesophageal, lung and pancreatic cancers. The charity funds the work of over 4,000 researchers, doctors and nurses throughout the UK, supports over 200 clinical trials and studies cancer and cancer risk in over a million people in the UK.

=== Research institutes ===
- The Cancer Research UK Scotland Institute (formerly the Cancer Research UK Beatson Institute), which sits within the University of Glasgow and has ties to the Beatson West of Scotland Cancer Centre
- The Cancer Research UK Cambridge Institute, which sits within the University of Cambridge close to Addenbrooke's Hospital on the Cambridge Biomedical Campus.
- The Cancer Research UK Manchester Institute, formerly the Paterson Institute for Cancer Research, which sits within the University of Manchester and has ties to the Christie Hospital.

=== Partnerships ===
- The Francis Crick Institute, with the Medical Research Council and the Wellcome Trust
- The Oxford Institute for Radiation Oncology, with the Medical Research Council
- The Gurdon Institute, with the Wellcome Trust
- The Manchester Cancer Research Centre, formed in 2006 by the University of Manchester, Cancer Research UK, and the Christie NHS Foundation Trust.
- National Cancer Research Institute which also includes the Medical Research Council (UK) and Blood Cancer UK.
- UK Department of Health, the Wellcome Trust, the National Health Service, NICE, and the Public Health England National Cancer Registration and Analysis Service.

=== Citizen-science projects ===
The charity participates in numerous citizen-science projects including:

- Cell Slider – its first project set up in 2012. Samples of breast cancer tumours, taken from earlier studies, were analysed through a web-based application.
- Play to Cure: Genes in Space – its first mobile game developed with Guerilla Tea, which originated as a prototype during a 48-hour game jam. Players plot routes to guide a spaceship in-game, which corresponds to analysis of genetic data.
- Reverse the Odds – a mobile game based upon 'Play to Cure: Genes in Space' but with greater accuracy, involved completing puzzles and answering questions on lung and bladder cancer samples.
- The Impossible Line – a mobile puzzle game spotting genetic faults in breast cancer data, provided evidence that the game aspect lowered accuracy.
- Trailblazer – a web-based application looking at tissue samples identifying the presence or absence of cancer cells.

=== Research centres ===
The charity funds networks in seven locations across the UK, to drive collaborations between universities, NHS hospitals, and other research organisations. Centre status is awarded to locations performing the highest quality cancer research, to provide funds for equipment and training. Centre status has been designated to:

- Cambridge: University of Cambridge
- City of London: King's College London, University College London, Barts Cancer Institute, Francis Crick Institute
- Convergence Science: Imperial College London and the Institute of Cancer Research
- Manchester: University of Manchester
- Newcastle: Newcastle University
- Oxford: University of Oxford
- Scotland: University of Edinburgh and University of Glasgow

=== Achievements and impact ===
Drugs developed by the organisation's scientists include:

- Cisplatin and carboplatin, cytotoxic chemotherapy drugs discovered at the Institute of Cancer Research in London.
- Abiraterone, a prostate cancer drug discovered at the Institute of Cancer Research in London.
- Temozolomide, which has an effect on glioblastoma, discovered by CRUK scientists at the University of Aston.
- Rucaparib, a PARP inhibitor drug discovered by CRUK scientists including Ruth Plummer at the Northern Institute for Cancer Research .
- Tamoxifen, a hormone therapy used to treat breast cancer and lower the risk of recurrence.

Several of the organisation's scientists have won major prizes, including:

- Tomas Lindahl: one of three recipients of the 2015 Nobel Prize in Chemistry, for mechanistic studies of DNA repair, joined the organisation as a researcher in 1981, and from 1986 was the first Director of their Clare Hall research institute in Hertfordshire, since 2015 part of the Francis Crick Institute.
- Paul Nurse and Tim Hunt: recipients of the 2001 Nobel Prize in Physiology or Medicine, for work started at the London Research Institute.
- Renato Dulbecco: recipient of the 1975 Nobel Prize in Physiology or Medicine, while deputy director of what was then the Imperial Cancer Research Fund.

== Other charitable activities ==
=== Information services ===
Through Cancer Health UK, a website written in Plain English, it provides information on cancer and cancer care, and a unique clinical trials database. A team of nurses provides a confidential telephone service, the Cancer Chat forum provides a place for users to talk to others affected by cancer, and mobile cancer awareness units deliver health information to locations of high cancer incidence and mortality. It provides statistical information via the Cancer Stats section. It also provides publications for the public to order and download.

Cancer Research UK publishes a twice-monthly professional medical journal, the British Journal of Cancer.

=== Influencing public policy ===
The charity worked to bring about the smoking ban in England and continues to campaign for further action on smoking. The charity lobbies for better screening programmes and advises on access to new cancer medicines.

== Sources of funding ==
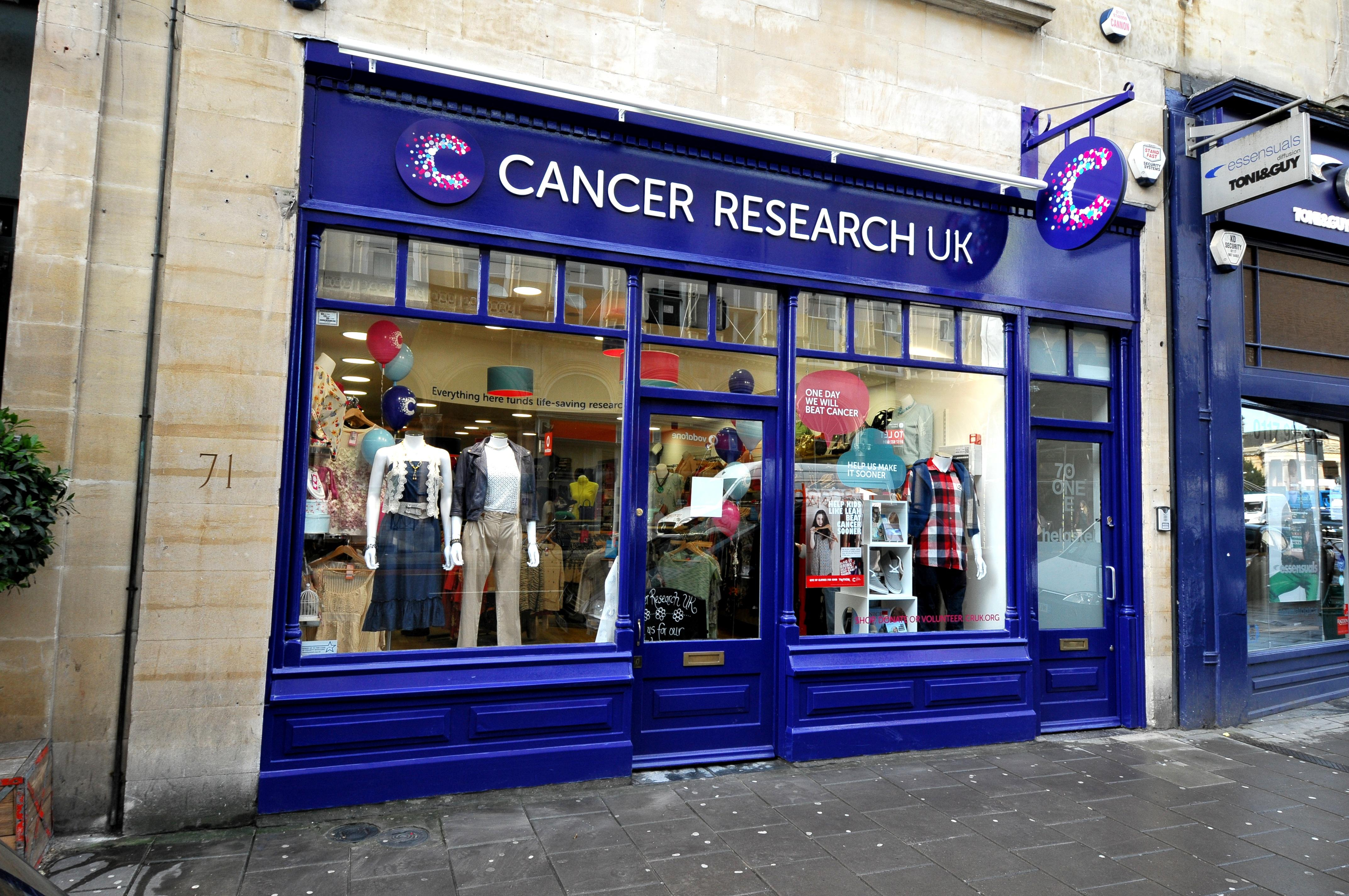
A Cancer Research UK charity shop in Bristol

Income sources include:

- Individual donations, regular giving and philanthropy, raising £191 million in 2019/20.
- Legacies from wills, raising £184 million in 2019/20.
- Royalties and grants from licensing its intellectual property, such as for the drug abiraterone, generating £118 million in 2019/20.
- Public participation fundraising events such as Race for Life, Stand Up to Cancer UK and a one off Race Against Cancer, raising £48 million in 2019/20.
- Around 600 charity shops selling new and donated second-hand goods, generating £10 million profit in 2019/20.

On 18 July 2012, it was announced that Cancer Research UK was to receive its largest single donation of £10 million from an anonymous donor. The money went towards the £100 million funding for the Francis Crick Institute in London.

During the COVID-19 pandemic in 2020, CRUK closed its shops and cancelled mass participation fundraising events. They predicted that this, coupled with economic uncertainty affecting people's ability or willingness to donate, would lead to a 30% fall in income that year and a reduction in income lasting at least 3 years. On 10 October 2025, Cancer Research UK publicly announced plans to close around 190 of its high street stores by May 2027, alongside its online marketplace operations by early 2026, whilst announcing plans to open a further 12 superstores by 2028. The charity cited growing operational costs, inflationary pressures and changes in consumer behaviour as key factors behind the decision.

== See also ==
- Cancer in the United Kingdom
- Childhood Cancer Parents Alliance
- European Organisation for Research and Treatment of Cancer (EORTC)
- European Registry of Hereditary Pancreatitis and Pancreatic Cancer (EUROPAC)
- London Research Institute
