= Shadow of the Stone =

1987 UK children's TV drama series

Shadow of the Stone is a 1987 British children's television drama series, starring Shirley Henderson. Written by Catherine Lucy Czerkawska and produced by Scottish Television, it dramatises a spiritual connection between a modern teenager and a 17th-century girl named Marie Lamont who was put on trial for alleged witchcraft. Scenes were filmed in and around Gourock, Scotland, including at the ancient megalith known as the Granny Kempock Stone. It was directed by Leonard White.

Originally networked on ITV from 26 July to 30 August 1987, it was later repeated on The Children's Channel from 12 June to 17 July 1994, retaining its original Sunday afternoon slot. It was made available on YouTube by STV in 2010, but has since disappeared. It received a rave review from Antonia Swinson in the Daily Express, which praised it for "explor(ing) how the power of Scots history dominates the present" and commented that Shirley Henderson had "a wonderful calm in front of the camera, yet one senses all sorts of magic brewing underneath".
