= Granny Kempock Stone =

Standing stone in Gourock, Inverclyde, Scotland

Coordinates: 55.9614°N 4.8198°W

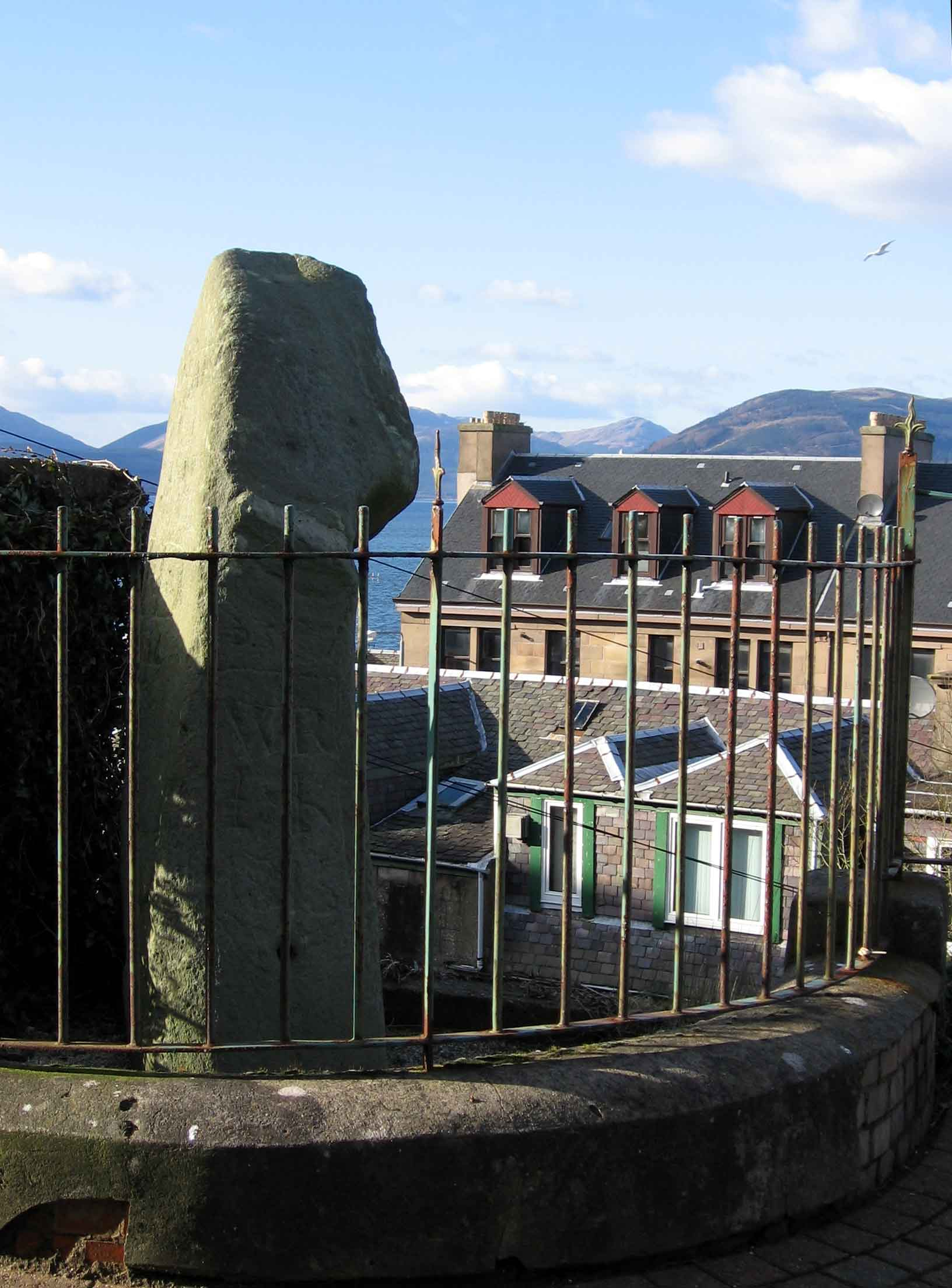
Granny Kempock Stone

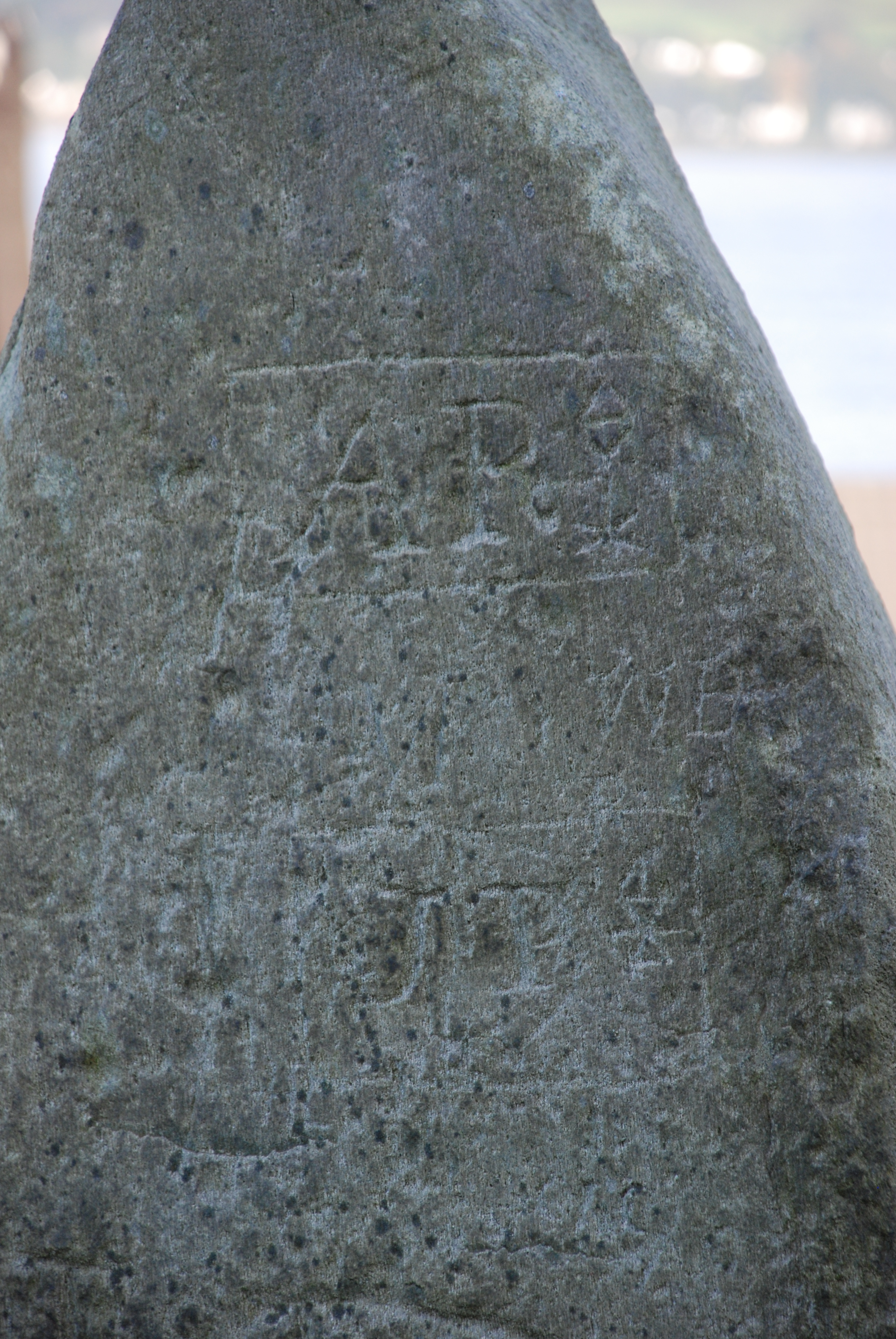
Granny Kempock Stone - detail of graffiti showing possible mason's marks

The megalithic Kempock Stone, popularly known as Granny Kempock (perhaps because of its resemblance to an old woman), stands on a cliff behind Kempock Street, the main shopping street in Gourock, Scotland. The stone, or menhir, is grey mica schist and of indeterminate origin, but it has been suggested that it is an old altar to the pagan god Baal, or a memorial to an ancient battle. Supposedly there is a superstition that for sailors going on a long voyage or a couple about to be married, walking seven times around the stone would ensure good fortune. A flight of steps winds up to the stone from Kempock Street below.

There is also an association with witchcraft. In 1662 Marie Lamont and a group of other local women were burned to death in the local area after it was alleged that she and her coven had danced around the stone on the sabbath, with the intention of cursing and sinking shipping that passed through the Clyde by casting the long-stone into the sea.

A decorative iron archway sits above the passageway leading up to the stone.

A number of markings exist on the stone. Some of these appear to be 17th- to 19th-century graffiti and most are obviously initials. Alongside some of these initials are some as yet unexplained symbols or markings which resemble modern-day navigation marks. These may be mason's marks but it is unclear why someone would claim artistry on an irregularly shaped piece of stone with no apparent working, unless of course it originally formed part of a larger structure, perhaps nearby Gourock Castle. There is also a 2 cm (3/4 in) hole at the bottom of the stone. It is not known if this hole goes all the way through the stone, but if it does, this could point to the stone having been moved at some point or used as perhaps an anchor stone or counterweight. Given the stone's current location it has been suggested that the stone's original location may have been elsewhere.

A 1987 children's fantasy TV series Shadow of the Stone written by Catherine Lucy Czerkawska dramatises the witchcraft element. The series stars Shirley Henderson in the role of a young girl, who has some kind of spiritual connection with Marie Lamont, and Alan Cumming as her boyfriend. Scenes were filmed in and around Gourock.

In "Notes about Gourock", published 1880, Reverend D. Macrae writes:

"A Bronze Age standing stone dating from about 2000bc.

This is the famous 'Lang Stane' of Gourock, more familiarly spoken of as 'Granny Kempock'... It is supposed that the Kempock Stone marks the site in Druid times of an altar to Baal...

However that may be, The Kempock Stane was for many centuries an object of superstitious awe and reverence... Marriages in the District were not regarded as lucky unless the wedded pair passed round the 'lang stane', and obtained in this way Granny Kempock's blessing...

It was chiefly in connection with the winds and sea that the Kempock Stane was regarded with superstitious dread... sailors and fishermen were we... to take a basketful of sand from the shore and walk seven times round Granny Kempock, chanting a weird song to insure for themselves a safe and prosperous voyage."

== See also ==
- Grannie stone
