= That Summer (Greig novel) =

2000 novel by Andrew Greig

- Author: Andrew Greig
- Language: English
- Genre: Novel
- Publisher: Faber & Faber
- Publication date: 2000
- Publication place: Scotland
- Media type: Print (Hardback & Paperback)
- Pages: 271 pp
- ISBN: 0-571-20473-2
- OCLC: 46602244

That Summer is the fourth novel by Scottish writer Andrew Greig. It was retitled The Clouds Above: A Novel of Love and War for the U.S. market.

== Plot summary ==
It is June 1940. Working class Len Westbourne, an inexperienced fighter pilot, falls in love with Stella Gardam, a more worldly radar operator. Stella's friend Maddy is killed in a bombing raid and Len's squadron colleague, Polish pilot Tad, dies in a flying accident.

Told in alternate chapters from the perspectives of Len and Stella, That Summer is a love story told against the background of the Battle of Britain. Len is injured when his Hawker Hurricane crashes and goes off to recuperate with Stella in the countryside.
