= Lesley Glaister =

British novelist, poet and playwright (born 1956)

Lesley Glaister FRSL
- Born: 4 October 1956 (age 69)
- Occupations: Novelist; poet; playwright
- Spouse: Andrew Greig
- Writing career
- Notable awards: Somerset Maugham Award (1991); Betty Trask Award (1991); Jerwood Fiction Uncovered Prize (2014)
- Website: lesleyglaister.co.uk

Lesley Glaister (born 4 October 1956) is a British novelist, poet and playwright. She has written 16 novels, A Particular Man (2024) being the most recent, one play and numerous short stories and radio plays. She is a lecturer in creative writing at the University of St Andrews, and is a regular contributor of book reviews to The Spectator and The Times. She is married to poet Andrew Greig.

Her subject matter is often serious (murder, madness and obsession crop up regularly in her books) but with a thread of dark humour running through it. Her first novel Honour Thy Father (1990) won the Somerset Maugham Award and a Betty Trask Award, Now You See Me was shortlisted for the Orange Prize for fiction in 2002, and Easy Peasy was shortlisted for the Guardian Fiction Prize in 1998. Little Egypt, published in 2014, won a Jerwood Fiction Uncovered Prize. Her first play, Bird Calls, was performed at the Crucible Theatre, Sheffield, in 2003.

Glaister is a Fellow of the Royal Society of Literature. She is currently writer in residence at the University of Edinburgh.

== Bibliography ==
- Honour Thy Father (1990)
- Trick or Treat (1990)
- Digging to Australia (1992)
- Limestone and Clay (1993)
- Partial Eclipse (1994)
- The Private Parts of Women (1996)
- Easy Peasy (1998)
- Sheer Blue Bliss (1999)
- Now You See Me (2001)
- As Far as You Can Go (2004)
- Nina Todd Has Gone (2007)
- Chosen (2010)
- Little Egypt (2014)
- The Squeeze (2017)
- Blasted Things (2020)
- A Particular Man (2024)
