= Galeterone =

Chemical compound

Clinical data
- Other names: TOK-001; VN/124-1; 17-(1H-Benzimidazol-1-yl)androsta-5,16-dien-3β-ol
- Routes of administration: By mouth

Identifiers
- IUPAC name: (3S,8R,9S,10R,13S,14S)-17-(benzimidazol-1-yl)-10,13-dimethyl-2,3,4,7,8,9,11,12,14,15-decahydro-1H-cyclopenta[a]phenanthren-3-ol
- CAS Number: 851983-85-2
- PubChem CID: 11188409
- ChemSpider: 9363493
- UNII: WA33E149SW
- KEGG: D10125
- CompTox Dashboard (EPA): DTXSID101025602
- ECHA InfoCard: 100.233.599

Chemical and physical data
- Formula: C_{26}H_{32}N_{2}O
- Molar mass: 388.555 g·mol^{−1}
- 3D model (JSmol): Interactive image
- SMILES: C[C@]12CC[C@@H](CC1=CC[C@@H]3[C@@H]2CC[C@]4([C@H]3CC=C4N5C=NC6=CC=CC=C65)C)O
- InChI: InChI=1S/C26H32N2O/c1-25-13-11-18(29)15-17(25)7-8-19-20-9-10-24(26(20,2)14-12-21(19)25)28-16-27-22-5-3-4-6-23(22)28/h3-7,10,16,18-21,29H,8-9,11-15H2,1-2H3/t18-,19-,20-,21-,25-,26-/m0/s1; Key:PAFKTGFSEFKSQG-PAASFTFBSA-N

Galeterone (developmental code names TOK-001, VN/124-1) is a steroidal antiandrogen which was under development by Tokai Pharmaceuticals for the treatment of prostate cancer. It possesses a unique triple mechanism of action, acting as an androgen receptor antagonist, androgen receptor down regulator, and CYP17A1 inhibitor, the latter of which prevents the biosynthesis of androgens. As a CYP17A1 inhibitor, galeterone shows selectivity for 17,20-lyase over 17α-hydroxylase.

Prostate cancer drug abiraterone and its analog galeterone are Δ5,3β-hydroxy steroids. Structures of these two agents are identical to endogenous steroid substrates (cholesterole, dehydroepiandorosterone and pregnenolone) for the 3β-hydroxysteroid dehydrogenase (3βHSD) of endocrine system. It has been reported that both of these agents are metabolized to 3-oxo-Δ4-steroids by 3βHSD in short period on oral administration. First metabolite 3-oxo-Δ4-abiraterone has more potent anti-prostate cancer properties than abiraterone where galeterone metabolite (3-oxo-Δ4-galaterone) has activity comparable to parent. Further these two metabolites undergo metabolism by 5α-reductase (5α-SRD) of endocrine system which leads to five more biologically inactive metabolites. It is known that galeterone has poor oral bioavailability in rodents. Poor pharmacokinetic properties (oral absorption and metabolic half-life) of galeterone may be the reason for its clinical compromise.

Galeterone, along with abiraterone acetate, has been identified as an inhibitor of sulfotransferases (SULT2A1, SULT2B1b, SULT1E1), which are involved in the sulfation of dehydroepiandrosterone and other steroids and compounds, with K_{i} values in the sub-micromolar range.

== Clinical development ==
Galeterone was being compared to enzalutamide in a phase III clinical trial (ARMOR3-SV) for AR-V7-expressing metastatic castration-resistant prostate cancer. Tokai announced the discontinuation of ARMOR3-SV on July 26, 2016, after a data monitoring committee determined that the trial was unlikely to meet its endpoint. On August 22, 2016, the company announced the discontinuation of their phase II expansion (ARMOR2) as well.

In August 2017, Tokai Pharmaceuticals discontinued the development of galeterone. On December 17, 2018, it was announced that Educational & Scientific, LLC (ESL), in conjunction with University of Maryland ventures, would develop the drug.
