= Progesterone synthesis inhibitor =

Drug class

A progesterone synthesis inhibitor, or progestogen synthesis inhibitor, is a type of drug which inhibits the enzymatic synthesis of progesterone. They include:

- Cholesterol side-chain cleavage enzyme inhibitors (P450SCC/CYP11A1 inhibitors): inhibit the synthesis of pregnenolone from cholesterol, thereby inhibiting the synthesis of most steroid hormones (which are derived from pregnenolone) including progesterone
- 3β-Hydroxysteroid dehydrogenase inhibitors (3β-HSD inhibitors): inhibit the conversion of pregnenolone into progesterone

Inhibitors of cholesterol synthesis can also reduce progesterone production by inhibiting cholesterol production.

Progesterone synthesis inhibitors have been researched for medical applications including use as contraceptives, abortifacients, and oxytocics, though ultimately they have never been marketed for such indications. Examples of such agents include the 3β-HSD inhibitors azastene (WIN-17625) and epostane (WIN-32729). Since progesterone is a precursor of many other steroid hormones, progesterone synthesis inhibitors can also be used medically as inhibitors of the synthesis of these other steroid hormones, including of androgens, estrogens, glucocorticoids, mineralocorticoids, and neurosteroids.

== See also ==
- Steroidogenesis inhibitor
- Androgen synthesis inhibitor
- Estrogen synthesis inhibitor
