= In Another Light =

2004 novel by Andrew Greig

- First edition
- Author: Andrew Greig
- Language: English
- Genre: Novel
- Publisher: Weidenfeld & Nicolson
- Publication date: 2004
- Publication place: Scotland
- Media type: Print (Hardback & Paperback)
- Pages: 512
- ISBN: 0-7538-2007-2
- OCLC: 57381051

In Another Light is the fifth novel by Scottish writer Andrew Greig. It won the 2004 Saltire Society Scottish Book of the Year Award, and was nominated in 2006 for the International Dublin Literary Award.

== Plot summary ==
The novel alternates between present-day Orkney and the 1930s in the dying days of the British Empire in Penang, British Malaya in South East Asia.

After a near-fatal illness, Edward Mackay decides to find out more about his late father's mysterious past. Dr Alexander Mackay's secret is gradually revealed by his son's findings. On the sea voyage to the East, the young doctor meets an eclectic crowd including the Simpson sisters, who are of unattainable social class, "both beautiful, one a gazelle". The doctor is gradually accepted into Penang society, and makes regular visits to the sisters, one of whom is married. Following a mysterious accident and a secret holiday in the Sumatran highlands, he leaves the island under a cloud of scandal.

Edward's investigations in the modern day are assisted by a trail of clues including a Buddha figurine and a double-one domino, and by an old lady, a blonde woman he bumps into in London, and an Orkney woman called Mica.
