= When They Lay Bare =

1999 novel by Andrew Greig

- First edition
- Author: Andrew Greig
- Language: English
- Genre: Novel
- Publisher: Faber & Faber
- Publication date: 1999
- Publication place: Scotland
- Media type: Print (Hardback & Paperback)
- Pages: 346 pp
- ISBN: 0-571-20121-0
- OCLC: 43341520

When They Lay Bare (1999) is the third novel by Scottish writer Andrew Greig.

== Plot summary ==
A mysterious young woman moves into deserted Crawhill cottage on the estate of Sir Simon Elliot in the Scottish Borders. He fears she is the daughter of his mistress: "If it wasn't the child, Sim wondered, who was she and what the hell was she doing moving into Crawhill? And if it was her, what had she came back for, why had she not come to see him? Instead she had taken up residence in the cottage and waited. What did the lassie want with Davy?"

The novel is based around a set of antique plates that the young woman brings with her, depicting the Border Ballads, "Twa Corbies" and "Barbara Allen".
