= Andrew Greig =

Scottish writer (born 1951)

- Born: 23 September 1951 (age 75)
- Occupations: Poet; novelist; memoirist
- Spouse: Lesley Glaister
- Writing career
- Notable awards: Eric Gregory Award (1972); Scottish Book of the Year (2004)
- Website: andrew-greig.weebly.com

Andrew Greig (born 23 September 1951) is a Scottish poet and novelist whose work has been widely recognised. His work has spanned mountain climbing, the natural world, and historical fiction.

== Biography ==
Greig was born in Bannockburn, near Stirling, and grew up there and in Anstruther, Fife. He first wanted to be a singer-songwriter, travelling to London in search of a record deal and also supporting John Martyn whom he knew through one of his school teachers. While still a teenager, having already started writing poetry, he shared some of his writing with the poet Norman MacCaig and travelled from Fife to meet him in Edinburgh. MacCaig's influence on Greig's career would persist until his death in 1996 and beyond:

I'd never call myself an intimate friend of MacCaig, but he was a role model, a mentor. I liked him, he really mattered to me, and as the years went on after his death, I increasingly missed him and thought about him.

After school, Greig took various temporary jobs while also writing. He then studied philosophy at the University of Edinburgh from 1971, graduating with an MA in 1975. After university he worked for a short time in advertising before deciding to concentrate on writing poetry.

Greig's writing led him to take up mountain climbing, but in 1987 he contracted ME/CFS, which brought that to an end. He continued writing during his illness and was recovered by 1997, but in 1999 he was afflicted by a colloid cyst, from which he almost died.

Greig is a former Glasgow University Writing Fellow and Scottish Arts Council Scottish/Canadian Exchange Fellow. He lives in Orkney and Edinburgh and has been married to author Lesley Glaister since 2000.

== Writing career ==
Greig published his first book of poetry, White Boats, jointly with Catherine Czerkawska in 1973, while he was still a student. He had been awarded the Eric Gregory Award in the previous year. His next volume, Men on Ice, was published in 1977. That marked Greig's first reference to mountain climbing, although he had not then actually climbed a mountain.

In 1985, Greig published an account of the successful ascent of the Muztagh Tower in the Himalayas. Summit Fever: The Story of an Armchair Climber was shortlisted for the 1996 Boardman Tasker Prize for Mountain Literature.

== Awards and nominations ==
Year	Title	Award	Category	Result	Ref.
1972	—	Eric Gregory Award	—	Won	
1992	Electric Brae: A Modern Romance	McVitie's Prize for Scottish Writer of the Year	—	Shortlisted	
1996	Summit Fever: The Story of an Armchair Climber	Boardman Tasker Prize for Mountain Literature	—	Shortlisted	
1996	The Return of John MacNab	Romantic Novelists' Association Award	—	Shortlisted	
2004	In Another Light	Scottish Book of the Year Award	—	Won	
2014	Fair Helen	Walter Scott Prize	—	Shortlisted	
2022	Rose Nicolson	Walter Scott Prize	—	Shortlisted	

== Published work ==
=== Poetry ===
- Greig, Andrew; Czerkawska, Catherine (1973). White Boats. Edinburgh: Garret Arts.
- —— (1977). Men on Ice. Edinburgh: Canongate Publishing. ISBN 0903937174.
- —— (1982). Surviving Passages. Edinburgh: Canongate. ISBN 0862410258.
- Greig, Andrew; Jamie, Kathleen (1986). A Flame in your Heart. Newcastle upon Tyne: Bloodaxe Books. ISBN 1852240172.
- —— (1990). The Order of the Day. Newcastle upon Tyne: Bloodaxe. ISBN 1852241020.
- —— (1994). Western Swing. Newcastle upon Tyne: Bloodaxe. ISBN 185224268X.
- —— (2001). Into You. Newcastle upon Tyne: Bloodaxe. ISBN 1852245557.
- —— (2006). This Life, This Life: New & Selected Poems 1970 - 2006. Newcastle upon Tyne: Bloodaxe. ISBN 978-1852247133.
- —— (2011). Getting Higher: The Complete Mountain Poems. Edinburgh: Polygon. ISBN 978-1846971921.
- —— (2011). As Though We Were Flying. Tarset: Bloodaxe. ISBN 978-1852249168.
- —— (2013). Found at Sea. Edinburgh: Polygon. ISBN 9781846972690.
- Butlin, Ron; Greig, Andrew; Lochhead, Liz; McCabe, Brian (2020). Horns & Wings & Stabiliser Things: The Lost Poets. Edinburgh: Polygon. ISBN 978-1846975554.

=== Non-fiction and memoir ===
- —— (1985). Summit Fever: The Story of an Armchair Climber. London: Hutchinson. ISBN 0091620600.
- —— (1986). Kingdoms of Experience: Everest, the Unclimbed Ridge. London: Hutchinson. ISBN 009165890X.
- —— (2006). Preferred Lies: A Journey to the Heart of Scottish Golf. London: Weidenfeld & Nicolson. ISBN 978-0297848356.
- —— (2010). At the Loch of the Green Corrie. London: Quercus. ISBN 978-1847249968.
- Heron, Mike; Greig, Andrew (2017). You Know What You Could Be: Tuning into the 1960s. London: Quercus. ISBN 978-1784293000.

=== Fiction ===
- —— (1992). Electric Brae: A Modern Romance. Edinburgh: Canongate. ISBN 0862414040.
- —— (1996). The Return of John MacNab. London: Headline Review. ISBN 0747217041.
- —— (1999). When They Lay Bare. London: Faber and Faber. ISBN 057119687X.
- —— (2000). That Summer. London: Faber and Faber. ISBN 0571204236. (Published in some markets as The Clouds Above: A Novel of Love and War.)
- —— (2004). In Another Light. London: Weidenfeld & Nicolson. ISBN 029784878X.
- —— (2008). Romanno Bridge. London: Quercus. ISBN 978-1847243157.
- —— (2013). Fair Helen. London: Quercus. ISBN 9780857381910.
- —— (2021). Rose Nicolson. London: Quercus. ISBN 9781784292980.

=== Articles ===
- —— (November 1983), "A White Elephant in Anstruther", in Lindsay, Maurice (ed.), The Scottish Review: Arts and Environment 32
