= Δ4-Abiraterone =

Chemical compound

Δ^{4}-Abiraterone

Clinical data
- Other names: D4A; CB-7627; 17-(3-Pyridyl)androsta-4,16-dien-3-one

Identifiers
- IUPAC name: (8R,9S,10R,13S,14S)-10,13-Dimethyl-17-pyridin-3-yl-1,2,6,7,8,9,11,12,14,15-decahydrocyclopenta[a]phenanthren-3-one
- CAS Number: 154229-21-7
- PubChem CID: 196941
- ChemSpider: 170572
- UNII: Z2L6XS2R7H
- CompTox Dashboard (EPA): DTXSID90934961

Chemical and physical data
- Formula: C_{24}H_{29}NO
- Molar mass: 347.502 g·mol^{−1}
- 3D model (JSmol): Interactive image
- SMILES: C[C@]12CCC(=O)C=C1CC[C@@H]3[C@@H]2CC[C@]4([C@H]3CC=C4C5=CN=CC=C5)C
- InChI: InChI=1S/C24H29NO/c1-23-11-9-18(26)14-17(23)5-6-19-21-8-7-20(16-4-3-13-25-15-16)24(21,2)12-10-22(19)23/h3-4,7,13-15,19,21-22H,5-6,8-12H2,1-2H3/t19-,21-,22-,23-,24+/m0/s1; Key:GYJZZAJJENTSTP-NHFPKVKZSA-N

Δ^{4}-Abiraterone (D4A; code name CB-7627), also known as 17-(3-pyridyl)androsta-4,16-dien-3-one, is a steroidogenesis inhibitor and active metabolite of abiraterone acetate, a drug which is used in the treatment of prostate cancer and is itself a prodrug of abiraterone (another active metabolite of abiraterone acetate). D4A is formed from abiraterone by 3β-hydroxysteroid dehydrogenase/Δ^{5-4} isomerase (3β-HSD). It is said to be a more potent inhibitor of steroidogenesis than abiraterone, and is partially responsible for the activity of abiraterone acetate.

D4A is specifically an inhibitor of CYP17A1 (17α-hydroxylase/17,20-lyase), 3β-HSD, and 5α-reductase. In addition, it has also been found to act as a competitive antagonist of the androgen receptor (AR), with potency reportedly comparable to that of enzalutamide. However, the initial 5α-reduced metabolite of D4A, 3-keto-5α-abiraterone, is an agonist of the AR, and has been found to stimulate prostate cancer progression. The formation of this metabolite can be blocked by the coadministration of dutasteride, a selective and highly potent 5α-reductase inhibitor, and the addition of this medication may improve the effectiveness of abiraterone acetate in the treatment of prostate cancer.
