= Catherine Czerkawska =

British novelist and playwright

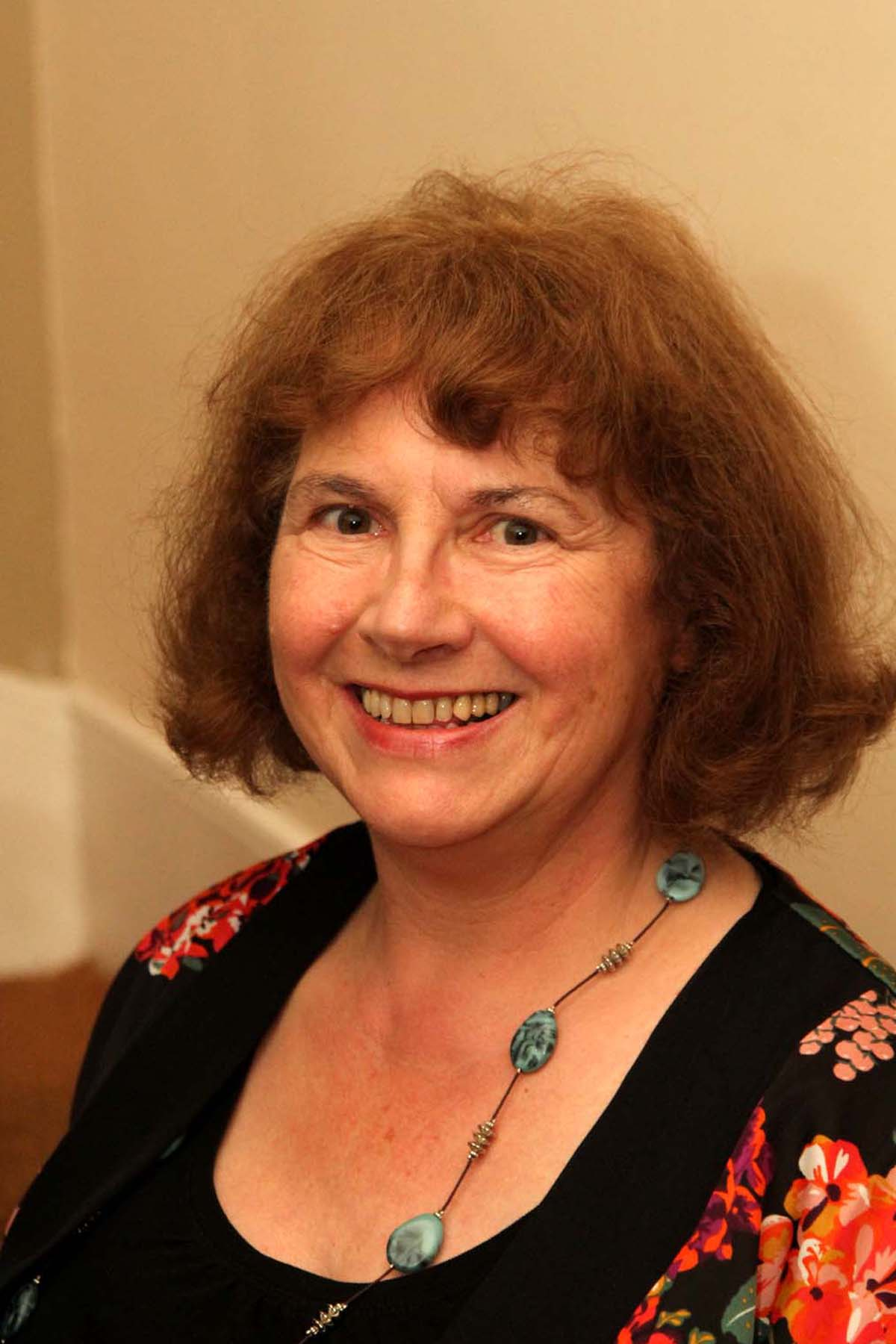
Catherine Czerkawska

Catherine Lucy Czerkawska (born 3 December 1950) is a Scottish-based novelist and playwright. She has written many plays for the stage and for BBC Radio 4 and has published numerous novels and short stories. Wormwood – about the Chernobyl disaster – was produced at Edinburgh's Traverse Theatre in 1997, while her novel The Curiosity Cabinet was shortlisted for the Dundee Book Prize in 2005.

== Early life ==
Born in Leeds, Yorkshire, to Julian Czerkawski and Kathleen Sunter, she attended Holy Family Primary School and Notre Dame Grammar School. The family moved to Ayrshire, Scotland, in 1962 where she attended Queen Margaret Academy in Ayr. After graduating from Edinburgh University with an honours degree in English Language and Literature with Mediaeval Studies, got a master's degree in Folk Life Studies at the University of Leeds. Her research dissertation on fishing traditions in South Ayrshire was the basis for her study Fisherfolk of Carrick, published in 1976, a work in which she commented on social relations and the role of women in that community:

Fishing marriages have a long history of partnership, with the wife not only keeping house for her husband but actively participating in his work. When we hear of wives carrying husbands on their backs through the shallows to the boat, as happened in the old days, it isn't really an example of outrageous masculine superiority! It was simply much more practical for the woman to go back and dry herself beside her own fire (her house would be close beside the beach anyway) than for her husband to spend uncomfortable hours in a boat which would be quite damp enough anyway!

She taught English as a foreign language in Tampere, Finland for two years and at Wroclaw University, drawing on her Polish connections, (sponsored by the British Council) for a further year. On her return she took up a position as Community Writer with the Arts in Fife, based in Cupar and thereafter became a full-time freelance writer.

== Career ==
Czerkawska began her writing life as a poet and radio playwright in Edinburgh. Her first collection of poems, White Boats, was a joint venture with Andrew Greig, published by Garret Arts in 1973. Her first solo collection, A Book of Men, was published by Akros in 1976 and won a Scottish Arts Council New Writing Award. Her first radio play, The Hare and the Fox, was broadcast around this time and she went on to write more than 100 hours of drama for BBC Radio 4.

She wrote numerous original plays, starting with Heroes and Others (1980), for the Scottish Theatre Company. O Flower of Scotland won a Pye Award for Best Original Drama 1980, while Bonnie Blue Hen won a Scottish Radio Industries Club Award for Best Production of 1982. She gained prominence in the next decade, when her 1997 play Wormwood (an ecologically themed play about the Chernobyl disaster) was produced by Traverse Theatre.

Through the 1980s and 90s she continued to write successfully for radio and for television including a six-part series for STV, called Shadow of the Stone, starring Alan Cumming and Shirley Henderson.

She worked for several years with artistic director John Murtagh on Borderline Theatre's community projects, including The Devil and Mary Lamont/Bonnie Blue Hen, 1995), . She was also commissioned to write audio material for the National Trust for Scotland, for Falkland Palace, Bannockburn and Culross in Fife. Her first published novel was the book of the television series, Shadow of the Stone. This was followed by The Golden Apple, written while she and her husband were living and working aboard a 50-foot catamaran in the Canary Isles. The novel is largely set on the Canarian island of La Gomera.

The Curiosity Cabinet, a novel based on a trilogy of the author's own radio plays of the same name, was shortlisted for the Dundee Book Prize in 2005 and subsequently published by Saraband. In 2006, she published a history of the people of Gigha, God's Islanders, which combined historical study with oral sources; a reviewer for The Scottish Historical Review gave it a mixed review, praising its "impressionistic view" but criticizing its lack of proper academic research in the discussion on the modern part of Gigha's history. Her stories have been published in an eclectic mix of magazines and anthologies including She, Company, Vogue, New Edinburgh Review and The London Review of Books. Her poem "Thread" was published in Antonia Fraser's anthology of Scottish love poems.

Her recent works, all published by Saraband include: The Physic Garden, The Jewel, and in 2019, A Proper Person to be Detained. The latter was recognized by The Irish Times as a notable book among those publish by small presses.

=== Stage plays ===
- Heroes And Others, Scottish Theatre Company, Royal Lyceum, Edinburgh (1980)
- The Devil And Mary Lamont, Borderline Community Theatre (1995)
- Bonnie Blue Hen, Borderline Community Theatre (1996)
- Wormwood, Traverse Theatre (1997)
- Quartz, Traverse Theatre (2000)
- The Price Of A Fish Supper, The Oran Mor, Glasgow (2005)
- Burns On The Solway, The Oran Mor, Glasgow (2006)
- The Secret Commonwealth, The Oran Mor, Glasgow (2010)

=== Television drama ===
- Ugly Sisters Scottish Television 1982
- The Showground Collection Scottish Television 1983
- The Shore Skipper Scottish Television 1984
- Shadow Of The Stone, Six Part Serial For Scottish Television 1986
- Strathblair BBC Television Two Episodes, 1988

=== Original plays for BBC Radio ===
- The Hare And The Fox 1973
- A Bit Of The Wilderness 1974
- O Flower Of Scotland 1979
- Noon Ghosts 1981
- Bonnie Blue Hen 1984
- The Butterfly Bowl 1985
- Maydays 1986
- The Golden Man 1987
- Bright As A Lamp, Simple As A Ring 1990
- Amber 1995
- Gnats
- Sardine Burial
- Cloud Cuckoo Land
- Tam O’ Shanter
- The Curiosity Cabinet (Trilogy)
- Running Before The Wind (4 Linked Plays)
- The Peggers And The Creelers (Trilogy) 1997
- Dark Star (The Life Of Lorna Moon)
- Vindolanda (5 Episodes)

=== Dramatisations and abridgements for BBC Radio ===
- Kidnapped And Catriona (10 Episodes) 1985
- The Bride Of Lammermoor (5 Episodes)
- The Hunchback Of Notre Dame (4 Episodes)
- Madame Butterfly
- The Mysteries Of Udolpho (2 Episodes)
- Mr Wrong
- Tales Of The Bizarre:Ray Bradbury Short Stories (6 Episodes)
- Pilgrimage (2 Episodes) 1997
- The Summer Book
- Learning To Swim
- Treasure Island
- Ben Hur (Four Episodes) 2004
- Feelings Under Siege (5 Episodes)
- La Grande Therese (10 Episodes)
- A Girl In Winter
- The Remains Of The Day
- The Price Of A Fish Supper (from the author's own stage play) 2007

=== Prose ===
- A Proper Person to be Detained (historical fiction; Saraband, 1999)
- God's Islanders: A History of the People (history; Birlinn, 2006)

== Teaching ==
She tutored Kilmarnock Gateway Writers for 15 years. She has tutored three courses for the Arvon Foundation at Moniack Mhor, ran workshops for the Traverse Theatre and worked with artistic director John Murtagh on community projects for Borderline Theatre. From 2005 to 2009 she was Royal Literary Fund Writing Fellow at the University of the West of Scotland. She is now part of the Live Literature Scotland's Writers in Public scheme, giving talks and lectures to writers and book groups throughout Scotland.

== Personal life ==
She lives in rural Ayrshire with her artist husband Alan Lees. Their son, Charlie Czerkawski, is a video game designer with Guerilla Tea, living and working in Dundee.
