= The Return of John MacNab =

1996 novel by Andrew Greig

The Return of John Macnab
- First edition
- Author: Andrew Greig
- Language: English
- Genre: Novel
- Publisher: Headline Review
- Publication date: 1996
- Publication place: Scotland
- Media type: Print (Hardcover & Paperback)
- Pages: 280 pp
- ISBN: 0-571-21258-1
- OCLC: 59431155

The Return of John Macnab was the second novel by Scottish writer Andrew Greig. The novel was shortlisted for the Romantic Novelists' Association Award.

== Plot summary ==
Andrew Greig has rewritten John Macnab by John Buchan for the late 20th century.

The plot follows the original closely. In John Macnab (1925), three bored successful friends in their mid-forties turn to poaching, under the collective name ‘John Macnab’, set up in the Highland home of a war hero and prospective Conservative MP.

In The Return of John Macnab three rather downcast friends (a copywriter whose wife has died suddenly on a plane flight; an ex-Special Forces soldier with a marital crisis; and a jaundiced left-wing joiner) decide to revive Buchan’s novel. They target an estate owned by a Moroccan, another rented by a Dutch corporation, and the third, Balmoral, traditional home of the British royal family in Scotland. The modern-day Macnabs are hijacked by Kirsty Fowler, a hard-living reporter and singer with a murky past.
