= Childhood Cancer Parents Alliance =

UK registered cancer charity

- Founded: 1999
- Type: Charitable organisation
- Registration no.: England and Wales: 1090871
- Purpose: Cancer support
- Region served: United Kingdom
- Key people: Rachael Olley, Chris Gibbs, Abby White, Richard Palmer
- Website: www.childcancerparents.org
- Formerly called: The National Alliance of Childhood Cancer Parent Organisations

The Childhood Cancer Parents Alliance (CCPA) — previously known as The National Alliance of Childhood Cancer Parent Organisations (NACCPO) — is a UK registered cancer charity to aid the stability of children's lives when they have been diagnosed with cancer. The charity focuses on the wellbeing and support of the whole family to bring together member groups to help the family in difficult times during treatment and medication.

== History ==
CCPA was originally formed as NACCPO in 1999 at a meeting with Mike Stevens, a Pediatric Oncologist at Birmingham Children's Hospital.

== Purpose ==
CCPA was set up to aid families where a child had been diagnosed with cancer. Thousands of children are diagnosed every year, which has a dramatic effect on their family due to medical requirements, costs, and disruption to normal daily life. CCPA's aim is to render assistance by various means such as providing holidays and sponsored events, such as celebrity football matches

== Member groups ==
CCPA has more than 35 member groups that combine efforts for their specific support

== See also ==
- Cancer in the United Kingdom
