= Marie Lamont =

Scottish woman executed for witchcraft (1646–1662)

- Born: 1646
- Died: 1662 (aged 15–16); Inverkip, Burgh of Renfrew, Scotland
- Cause of death: Executed for witchcraft
- Known for: Young age at the time of execution

Marie Lamont (1646–1662), also referred to as Mary Lawmont, was executed for witchcraft during the reign of Charles II, during a time when witch trials were common. Her youth at the time of her execution made her case unusual.

== Life ==
Marie Lamont lived in Inverkip parish, in the shire of Renfrew, where persecution of witches was particularly rife between the years 1640–1690. At a young age she was accused of being a witch, and after confessing was presented for trial on 7 May 1662.

=== Background ===
Sir Archibald Stewart of Blackhall, Laird of Ardgowan had applied to the Privy Council for a Royal Enquiry into the practice of witchcraft in the Inverkip area. During this later period of witch persecution the right to assemble a number of commissions of justiciary was granted by the Privy Council to gentlemen in every county. The enquiries preceding the commissions of justiciary were supplementary to the regular enquiries instituted by the State and Church. The Royal Enquiry relevant to Marie Lamont appointed a commission of nine men, one of whom was Sir Archibald Stewart the Sheriff Depute of Perth- a man who was probably a relative of Sir Archibald Stewart the Younger of Blackhall. The other members of the commission were John Brisbane the Younger of Bishopton, Cornelius Crawford of Jordanhill, Alexander Cuningham of Craigends (a church elder), Sir George Maxwell of Nether Pollok, Hugh Montgomery of Silverwood (another Sheriff Depute), Robert Montgomery of Hazlehead, John Porterfield the Younger of that Ilk, and Archibald Stewart of Scotstown. Sir Archibald Stewart of Blackhall himself was not part of the commission but nevertheless was present at the trial. The Reverend John Hamilton, minister at Inverkip between 1626–1664, was also involved in Marie's case but is not listed as being part of the commission. The Rev Hamilton was known to be a 'zealous persecutor of witches' and by the end of his career had adopted a radical approach to Presbyterianism. A graduate minister of the time could enhance his prestige and show himself to be worthy of his hire by using his academic learning (learning being considered particularly important in cases of witchcraft) to protect the local community against Satan and his witch followers.

The witch hunts in 17th century Scotland were sanctioned by the Witchcraft Act of 1563, which had made the practice of witchcraft a capital offence. Society at the time was strongly patriarchal, with women being generally oppressed. The usual victims of the hunts were female, and a commonly shared characteristic was a sharp tongue along with a lack of deference shown towards authority. Where the social class of the accused was known, most (64%) fell into the middle range; of the remainder 29% were in the lowest socioeconomic group and 6% the highest. The ages recorded showed the majority (75%) to have been between 30 and 60 years old.

The torture and degradation to which the victims were subjected prior to the trial itself were often so severe that a confession was seen to be the best option for the accused, and execution would come as a release.

By the time of Marie Lamont's trial the prerequisites for putting a person accused of witchcraft to trial had become more rigorous, and the Privy Council had stated that a confession must be voluntary and not obtained under torture. In June 1661, the year before Marie appeared before the Commission, the precondition was added that the accused must be "of compleat age", and by July 1662 had further added that the accused must not be subjected to pressure and must be of sound mind. The preconditions were open to interpretation at a local level where older views were still prevalent. Being troubled in conscience or having feelings of despair were viewed by Puritans as the emotional sign of the liminal stage between the life of sin and that of regeneration and thus the accused being in this state of mind could be interpreted as confirmation of guilt.

=== Confession and execution ===
Marie's trial was held in the locale and lasted for one day. At trial she freely admitted that she had become a witch at the age of 13 years, when under the influence of Catherine Scott she allegedly renounced her Christian faith, was baptised by the devil and renamed "Clowts". She confessed to having sexual relations with the devil several times when he appeared to her as a brown dog, and this had left marks on her right side where he had nipped her. She said that along with Jean King, Kattie Scott, Janet Holm and sundry others she had met at the bucht-gait of Ardgowan in the presence of the devil, who appeared to them on this occasion in the shape of a black man with cloven feet. They were directed to gather sand from the shore and scatter it about yetts of Ardgowan, and about the minister's house. She was accused of shape shifting into a cat and of stealing milk by means of magic. The milk theft involved drawing a tether made from the hair of many cows' tails over the mouth of a mug and speaking the words "In God's name, God send us milk, God send it, and meikle of it". Marie also confessed to dancing round the Kempock Stone with others and attempting to throw the stone into the sea, the intention being to sink ships sailing in the Firth of Clyde.

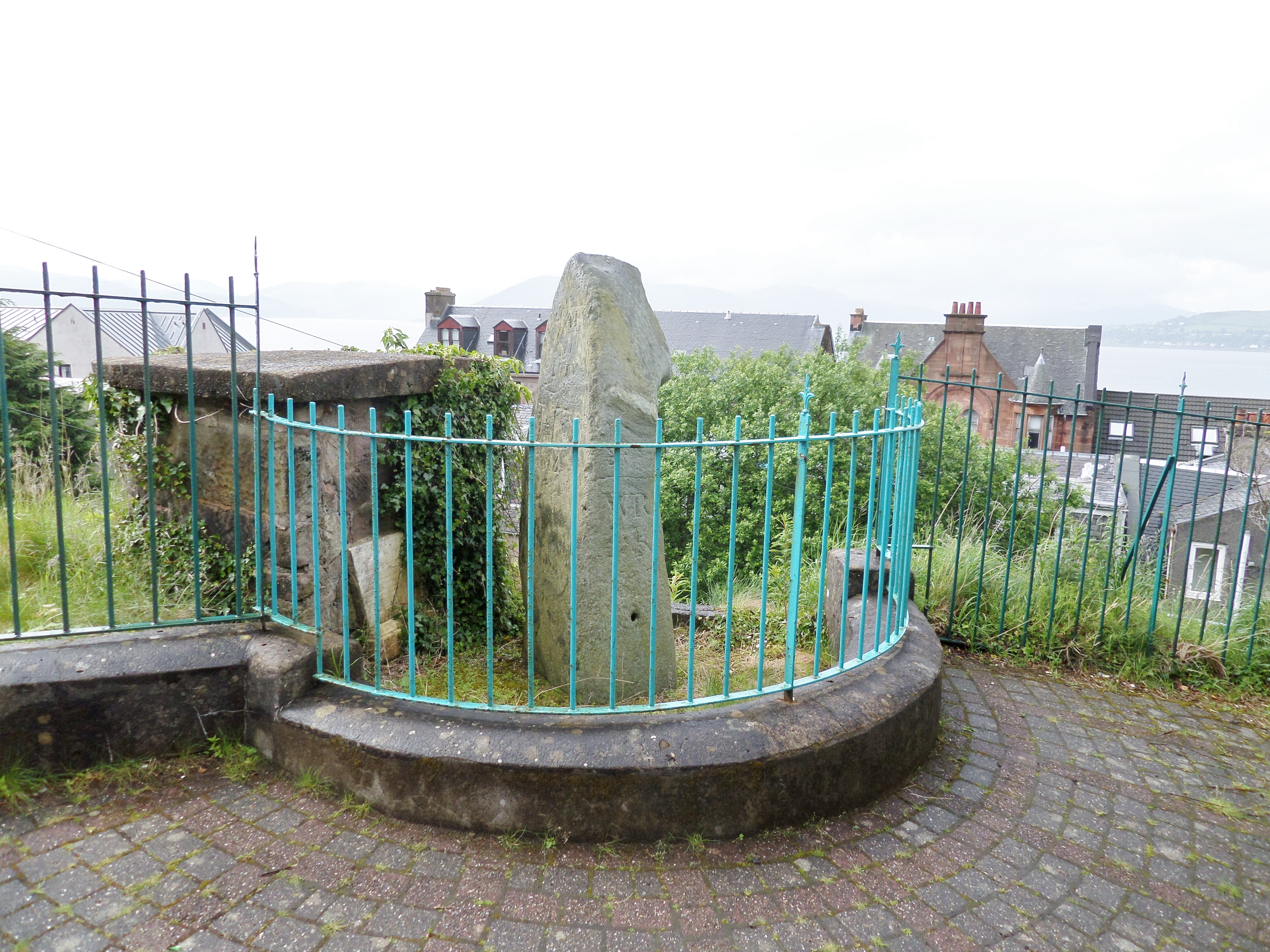
The Kempock Stone, Gourock with the Firth of Clyde beyond

On the same day and by the same commission five other women were tried for witchcraft. These women are named as Margaret Duff, Jonet (sic) Hynman, Margret (sic) Letch, Margret (sic) Rankin, and Kathrin Scott.

Lawmont was burned at the stake in 1662, possibly outside the Auldkirk of Inverkip.
