= Androgen synthesis inhibitor =

Drug class

An androgen synthesis inhibitor is a type of drug which inhibits the enzymatic synthesis of androgens, such as testosterone and dihydrotestosterone (DHT). They include:

- CYP17A1 inhibitors (17α-hydroxylase/17,20-lyase inhibitors): inhibit the synthesis of androgens from pregnanes
- 3β-Hydroxysteroid dehydrogenase inhibitors (3β-HSD inhibitors): inhibit the conversion of weaker androgens such as dehydroepiandrosterone (DHEA) and androstenediol into more potent androgens like and testosterone
- Cholesterol side-chain cleavage enzyme inhibitors (P450SCC/CYP11A1 inhibitors): inhibit the synthesis of pregnenolone from cholesterol, thereby inhibiting the synthesis of most steroid hormones (which are derived from pregnenolone) including androgens
- 17β-Hydroxysteroid dehydrogenase inhibitors (17β-HSD inhibitors): inhibit the interconversion of androgens, including the synthesis of testosterone from the less-potent androstenedione
- 5α-Reductase inhibitors (5α-RIs; SRD5A inhibitors): inhibit the conversion of testosterone into the more potent DHT
- Steroid sulfatase inhibitors (STS inhibitors): inhibit the conversion of inactive androgen sulfates into active androgens like testosterone

Inhibitors of cholesterol synthesis can also reduce androgen production by inhibiting cholesterol production.

Androgen synthesis inhibitors have medical applications in the treatment of benign prostatic hyperplasia, prostate cancer, androgenetic alopecia, hirsutism, precocious puberty, and hyperandrogenism, among other androgen-dependent conditions.

Because androgens are the endogenous precursors of estrogens, androgen synthesis inhibitors also function as estrogen synthesis inhibitors and can reduce estrogen production and levels.

== See also ==
- Antiandrogen § Androgen synthesis inhibitors
- Steroidogenesis inhibitor
- Progesterone synthesis inhibitor
- Estrogen synthesis inhibitor
