= 3-Keto-5α-abiraterone =

Chemical compound

Clinical data
- Other names: 17-(3-Pyridyl)-5α-androst-16-en-3-one

Identifiers
- IUPAC name: (5S,8R,9S,10S,13S,14S)-10,13-Dimethyl-17-pyridin-3-yl-1,2,4,5,6,7,8,9,11,12,14,15-dodecahydrocyclopenta[a]phenanthren-3-one
- CAS Number: 154229-26-2
- PubChem CID: 11725391
- ChemSpider: 9900107
- UNII: 675L8BAG4G
- CompTox Dashboard (EPA): DTXSID00471175

Chemical and physical data
- Formula: C_{24}H_{31}NO
- Molar mass: 349.518 g·mol^{−1}
- 3D model (JSmol): Interactive image
- SMILES: C[C@]12CCC(=O)C[C@@H]1CC[C@@H]3[C@@H]2CC[C@]4([C@H]3CC=C4C5=CN=CC=C5)C
- InChI: InChI=1S/C24H31NO/c1-23-11-9-18(26)14-17(23)5-6-19-21-8-7-20(16-4-3-13-25-15-16)24(21,2)12-10-22(19)23/h3-4,7,13,15,17,19,21-22H,5-6,8-12,14H2,1-2H3/t17-,19-,21-,22-,23-,24+/m0/s1; Key:FKNZCFYWNHCQGE-IRMBCWQZSA-N

3-Keto-5α-abiraterone, also known as 17-(3-pyridyl)-5α-androst-16-en-3-one, is an active metabolite of abiraterone acetate that has been found to possess androgenic activity and to stimulate prostate cancer progression. It is formed as follows: abiraterone acetate to abiraterone by esterases; abiraterone to Δ^{4}-abiraterone by 3β-hydroxysteroid dehydrogenase/Δ^{5-4} isomerase; and Δ^{4}-abiraterone to 3-keto-5α-abiraterone by 5α-reductase. 3-Keto-5α-abiraterone may counteract the clinical effectiveness of abiraterone acetate, and so inhibition of its formation using the 5α-reductase inhibitor dutasteride is being investigated as an adjunct to abiraterone acetate in the treatment of prostate cancer.
