= Guerilla Tea =

UK video game developer

Guerilla Tea Games Limited
- Company type: Private
- Industry: Video games
- Founded: 2011
- Defunct: 2018
- Headquarters: Dundee, Scotland
- Products: Play to Cure: Genes in Space; The Quest; Staking Claims; Beano iPrank; Sandbox TD

Guerilla Tea was an independent British video game developer based in Dundee, Scotland. The company is focused on the mobile and casual market and is interested in utilising video games design and technology within other areas of study.

Guerilla Tea developed Play to Cure: Genes in Space in conjunction with Cancer Research UK; a world first game in which players analyse genetic data by playing the game. The project was released in February 2014, and has gone on to receive critical acclaim within the games and mainstream press, including a feature on The One Show.

Within one month of release there were 1.5 million genetic data classifications.

March 2014 saw the re-release of Guerilla Tea's debut title, The Quest, for mobile devices. They are currently working on Sandbox TD, and a number of smaller titles for mobile and web.

The company was dissolved in 2018.

== History ==
Guerilla Tea was founded in 2011 by four graduates from the Professional Masters in Video Game Development course at Abertay University.

The company's first original IP release was the Rubik's Cube inspired puzzle game, The Quest, on iOS and Android. This was followed closely by a win in the TIGA £100k competition, allowing the team to develop a prototype for an aerial combat game.

From here, Guerilla Tea established a relationship with DC Thomson and developed a number of web-based mini-games to tie in the Beano and Dandy brands, along with a prank collection app called Beano iPrank.

In 2013, Guerilla Tea were approached by Cancer Research UK, and were eventually selected to develop the planned citizen science project, Play to Cure: Genes in Space, which was released on 4 February 2014.

== Play to Cure: Genes in Space ==
Play to Cure: Genes in Space is a world first game in which players help to analyse genetic data by playing. The game is set 800 years in the future and places players in the employ of Bifrost Industries, a leading organisation in the processing of the fictional chemical resource, Element Alpha.

The gameplay involves players collecting Element Alpha and negotiating asteroid fields, then trading in the chemical for spaceship upgrades, and progression through the game's ‘employee ranking system’. The Element Alpha deposits double as the genetic data samples. Gameplay is divided into distinct sections:

- Route Mapping: Players plot their course through space, identifying the most dense areas of Element Alpha. By mapping this route, players are analysing a data sample.
- Harvesting: Player's control a vessel flying through space, collecting Element Alpha. The spacecraft position also doubles as data analysis.
- Asteroid Field: This is distinct from any underlying analysis, but players must survive the asteroid field (using a range of weapons) in order to retain their Element Alpha cargo collected during harvesting.

== Events ==
In early 2012 Guerilla Tea ran a workshop with the help of Enable Scotland where a small group of young people who have learning disabilities worked alongside company staff to design and create a small video game in a single afternoon. The company worked with Enable Scotland's East Renfrewshire Local Area Coordination Team to put on the event, which took place in Glasgow.

The game developed was called On The Freerun, and was released on iOS and Android within the week following the event.

With the re-release of The Quest in March 2014, and Staking Claims the following month, the studio is now working on a series of smaller titles for mobile devices and web. In tandem with this, the studio is working on a number of games which all attempt to stir up childhood nostalgia in players; Sandbox TD is a part of the series and currently in development.

== Games ==
=== Original Titles ===
- The Quest
- Sandbox TD
- Staking Claims
- Array
- Fangs Out!

=== Work-For-Hire ===
- Ward Round
- Go Go Go Bananas!
- Dollops
- The Dandy Minigames
- Beano iPrank
- Dennis and Gnasher
- Excuse-O-Matic
- Play to Cure: Genes in Space
