= CYP17A1 inhibitor =

Drug class

- Drug class
- Abiraterone acetate, a steroidal CYP17A1 inhibitor that is used in the treatment of prostate cancer.

Class identifiers
- Synonyms: Androgen synthesis inhibitors
- Use: Prostate cancer, precocious puberty, breast cancer, others
- ATC code: L02BX
- Biological target: CYP17A1
- Chemical class: Steroidal; Nonsteroidal

Legal status

A CYP17A1 inhibitor is a type of drug that inhibits the enzyme CYP17A1. CYP17A1 inhibitors work by blocking specific enzyme functions, impacting androgen biosynthesis.

== Mechanism of action ==
CYP17A1 inhibitors may inhibit one or both of the enzyme’s functions: 17α-hydroxylase and 17,20-lyase. Some inhibitors are selective and target only the 17,20-lyase function, while others inhibit both functions. By inhibiting these enzymatic functions, CYP17A1 inhibitors prevent the conversion of pregnane steroids into androgens like testosterone. This action classifies them as androgen biosynthesis inhibitors and functional antiandrogens.

== Examples ==
Examples of CYP17A1 inhibitors include the older drug ketoconazole and the newer drugs abiraterone acetate, orteronel, galeterone, and seviteronel.

== Clinical uses ==
CYP17A1 inhibitors, such as abiraterone acetate, are primarily used in the treatment of prostate cancer. These drugs reduce androgen levels, which helps to slow the progression of prostate cancer in patients with castration-resistant prostate cancer.

== Combination with glucocorticoids ==
Non-selective CYP17A1 inhibitors that inhibit both the 17α-hydroxylase and 17,20-lyase functions must be administered alongside a glucocorticoid (e.g., prednisone) to prevent adrenal insufficiency and mineralocorticoid excess. This precaution is necessary because non-selective inhibitors can disrupt cortisol production, leading to hormone imbalances.

== See also ==
- Steroidogenic enzyme
- Steroidogenesis inhibitor
- Nonsteroidal antiandrogen
- Gonadotropin-releasing hormone analogue
