= CYP17A1 =

Protein-coding gene in humans

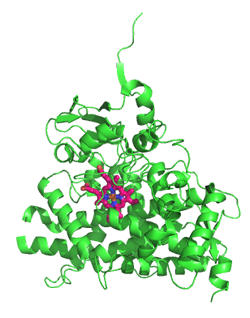

Identifiers
- Aliases: CYP17A1, CPT7, CYP17, P450C17, S17AH, cytochrome P450 family 17 subfamily A member 1
- External IDs: OMIM: 609300; MGI: 88586; GeneCards: CYP17A1
Available structures
PDB	Ortholog search: PDBe RCSB
PDB	List of PDB id codes 3RUK, 3SWZ, 4NKV, 4NKW, 4NKX, 4NKY, 4NKZ
Enzyme activity
EC #	BRENDA	ExPASy	KEGG	MetaCyc
1.14.14.19	↗	↗	↗	↗
1.14.14.32	↗	↗	↗	↗

Gene location (Human)
Chr.	Chromosome 10 (human)
Band	10q24.32	Start	102,830,531 bp
Band	10q24.32	End	102,837,472 bp

Gene location (Mouse)
Chr.	Chromosome 19 (mouse)
Band	19 C3|19 38.97 cM	Start	46,655,604 bp
Band	19 C3|19 38.97 cM	End	46,661,611 bp
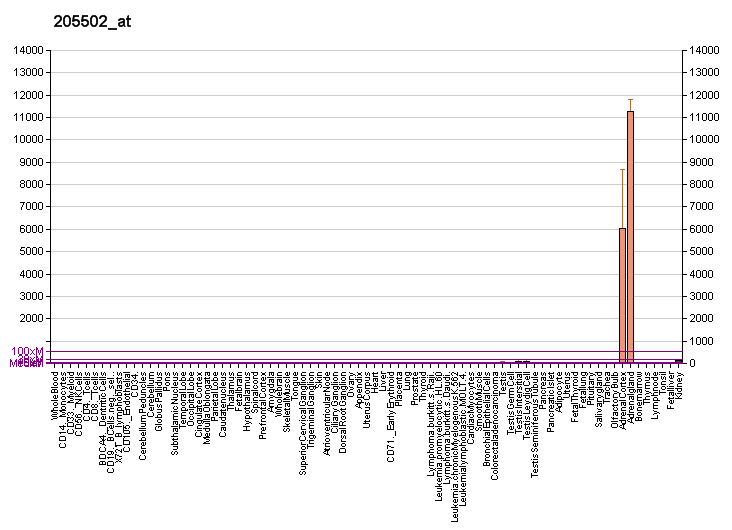
RNA expression pattern
Bgee	Human / Mouse (ortholog); Top expressed in: right adrenal gland; right adrenal cortex; left adrenal cortex; human kidney; right testis; right uterine tube; right lobe of liver; left testis; right coronary artery; left lobe of thyroid gland / Top expressed in: Gonadal ridge; Leydig cell; spermatocyte; seminiferous tubule; adrenal cortex; placenta; theca folliculi; epithelium of epididymis; lip; decidua; More reference expression data
BioGPS	More reference expression data
Gene ontology
Molecular function	iron ion binding; oxygen binding; metal ion binding; steroid 17-alpha-monooxygenase activity; monooxygenase activity; heme binding; oxidoreductase activity, acting on paired donors, with incorporation or reduction of molecular oxygen; lyase activity; oxidoreductase activity; 17-alpha-hydroxyprogesterone aldolase activity
Cellular component	endoplasmic reticulum membrane; membrane; axon; soma; endoplasmic reticulum
Biological process	progesterone metabolic process; androgen biosynthetic process; glucocorticoid biosynthetic process; sterol metabolic process; hormone biosynthetic process; steroid biosynthetic process; steroid metabolic process; sex differentiation
Sources:Amigo / QuickGO
Orthologs
Databases	NCBI: entry; OMA: entry
Species	Human	Mouse
Entrez	1586	13074
Ensembl	ENSG00000148795	ENSMUSG00000003555
UniProt	P05093	P27786
RefSeq (mRNA)	NM_000102	NM_007809
RefSeq (protein)	NP_000093	NP_031835
Location (UCSC)	Chr 10: 102.83 – 102.84 Mb	Chr 19: 46.66 – 46.66 Mb
PubMed search
- Wikidata
View/Edit Human	View/Edit Mouse

Steroid 17-alpha-hydroxylase/17,20 lyase

Identifiers
- EC no.: 1.14.14.19
- CAS no.: 9029-67-8
- Alt. names: P450c17, CYP17A1, steroid 17-alpha-hydroxylase/17,20 lyase, CYPXVII, cytochrome P450 17A1, cytochrome p450 XVIIA1, cytochrome P450-C17, cytochrome P450, family 17, subfamily A, polypeptide 1, steroid 17-alpha-monooxygenase, cytochrome P450c17, 4.1.2.30, 17-alpha-hydroxyprogesterone aldolase, cytochrome P450, subfamily XVII (steroid 17-alpha-hydroxylase), steroid 17 alpha-hydroxylase/17,20 lyase, IPR033282

Databases
- BRENDA: enzyme data
- ExPASy: NiceZyme view
- KEGG: enzyme entry
- MetaCyc: metabolic pathway
- Rhea: reactions
- PDB structures: RCSB PDB PDBe PDBsum
Search
- PMC: articles
- PubMed: articles
- NCBI: proteins

Cytochrome P450 17A1 (steroid 17α-monooxygenase, 17α-hydroxylase, 17-alpha-hydroxylase, 17,20-lyase, 17,20-desmolase) is an enzyme of the hydroxylase type that in humans is encoded by the CYP17A1 gene on chromosome 10. It is ubiquitously expressed in many tissues and cell types, including the zona reticularis and zona fasciculata (but not zona glomerulosa) of the adrenal cortex as well as gonadal tissues. It has both 17α-hydroxylase and 17,20-lyase activities, and is a key enzyme in the steroidogenic pathway that produces progestins, mineralocorticoids, glucocorticoids, androgens, and estrogens. More specifically, the enzyme acts upon pregnenolone and progesterone to add a hydroxyl (-OH) group at carbon 17 position (C17) of the steroid D ring (the 17α-hydroxylase activity, EC 1.14.14.19), or acts upon 17α-hydroxyprogesterone and 17α-hydroxypregnenolone to split the side-chain off the steroid nucleus (the 17,20-lyase activity, EC 1.14.14.32).

== Structure ==
=== Gene ===
The CYP17A1 gene resides on chromosome 10 at the band 10q24.3 and contains 8 exons. The cDNA of this gene spans a length of 1527 bp. This gene encodes a member of the cytochrome P450 superfamily of enzymes. The cytochrome P450 proteins are generally regarded as monooxygenases that catalyze many reactions involved in drug metabolism and synthesis of cholesterol, steroids, and other lipids, including the remarkable carbon-carbon bond scission catalyzed by this enzyme.

The CYP17A1 gene may also contain variants associated with increased risk of coronary artery disease.

=== Protein ===
CYP17A1 is a 57.4 kDa protein that belongs to the cytochrome P450 family. The protein encoded by its cDNA is composed of 508 amino acid residues. As an enzyme, CYP17A1 possesses an active site that associates with a heme prosthetic group to catalyze biosynthetic reactions. Based on its known structures while bound to two steroidal inhibitors, abiraterone and galeterone, CYP17A1 possesses the canonical cytochrome P450 fold present in other complex P450 enzymes that participate in steroidogenesis or cholesterol metabolism, though it orients the steroid ligands toward the F and G helices, perpendicular to the heme group, rather than the β1 sheet.

== Expression ==
Expression of CYP17A1 has been found in all of the traditional steroidogenic tissues except the placenta, including the zona reticularis and zona fasciculata of the adrenal cortex, the Leydig cells of the testes, the thecal cells of the ovaries, and, more recently, in luteinized granulosa cells in ovarian follicles. In addition to classical steroidogenic tissue, CYP17A1 has also been detected in the heart, kidney, and adipose tissue. In the fetus, CYP17A1 has been reported in the kidney, thymus, and spleen.

== Function ==
CYP17A1 is a member of the cytochrome P450 superfamily of enzymes localized in the endoplasmic reticulum. Proteins in this family are monooxygenases that catalyze synthesis of cholesterol, steroids and other lipids and are involved in drug metabolism. CYP17A1 has both 17α-hydroxylase activity (EC 1.14.14.19) and 17,20-lyase activity (EC 1.14.14.32). The 17α-hydroxylase activity of CYP17A1 is required for the generation of glucocorticoids such as cortisol, but both the hydroxylase and 17,20-lyase activities of CYP17A1 are required for the production of androgenic and oestrogenic sex steroids by converting 17α-hydroxypregnenolone to dehydroepiandrosterone (DHEA). Mutations in this gene are associated with isolated steroid-17α-hydroxylase deficiency, 17α-hydroxylase/17,20-lyase deficiency, pseudohermaphroditism, and adrenal hyperplasia.

Furthermore, the 17,20-lyase activity is dependent on cytochrome P450 oxidoreductase (POR) cytochrome b5 (CYB5) and phosphorylation. Cytochrome b5 acts as a facilitator for 17,20 lyase activity of CYP17A1 and can donate a second electron to some P450s. In humans the production of testosterone via pregnenolone to17-OHPreg and DHEA by the CYP17A1 requires POR. Human CYP17A1 protein is phosphorylated on serine and threonine residues by a cAMP-dependent protein kinase. Phosphorylation of the protein increases 17,20-lyase activity, while dephosphorylation virtually eliminates this activity.

== Clinical significance ==
Mutations in this gene are associated with rare forms of congenital adrenal hyperplasia, specifically 17α-hydroxylase deficiency/17,20-lyase deficiency and isolated 17,20-lyase deficiency.

In humans, the CYP17A1 gene is largely associated with endocrine effects and steroid hormone metabolism. Furthermore, mutations in the CYP17A1 gene are associated with rare forms of congenital adrenal hyperplasia, in particular 17α-hydroxylase deficiency/17,20-lyase deficiency and isolated 17,20-lyase deficiency. Overall, CYP17A1 is an important target for inhibition in the treatment of prostate cancer because it produces androgen that is required for tumor cell growth. The decreased enzyme activity of CYP17A1 is related to infertility due to hypogonadotropic hypogonadism. In females, folliculogenesis is arrested, while in males, testicular atrophy with interstitial cell proliferation and arrested spermatogenesis. Although generally anovulatory, there are some case reports of women with 17α-hydroxylase deficiency who underwent spontaneous menarche with cyclic menses.

=== Clinical marker ===
A multi-locus genetic risk score study based on a combination of 27 loci, including the CYP17A1 gene, identified individuals at increased risk for both incident and recurrent coronary artery disease events, as well as an enhanced clinical benefit from statin therapy. The study was based on a community cohort study (the Malmo Diet and Cancer study) and four additional randomized controlled trials of primary prevention cohorts (JUPITER and ASCOT) and secondary prevention cohorts (CARE and PROVE IT-TIMI 22).

== As a drug target ==
=== CYP17A1 inhibitors ===
In 2011, the FDA approved the CYP17A1 inhibitor, abiraterone, which contains a steroidal scaffold that is similar to the endogenous CYP17A1 substrates, with prednisone for the treatment of castration-resistant prostate cancer. Abiraterone is structurally similar to the substrates of other cytochrome P450 enzymes involved in steroidogenesis, and interference can pose a liability in terms of side effects. Using nonsteroidal scaffolds is expected to enable the design of compounds that interact more selectively with CYP17A1. Potent inhibitors of the CYP17A1 enzyme provide a last line defense against ectopic androgenesis in advanced prostate cancer.

The drug abiraterone acetate, which is used to treat castration-resistant prostate cancer, blocks the biosynthesis of androgens by inhibiting the CYP17A1 enzyme. Abiraterone acetate binds in the active site of the enzyme and coordinates the heme iron through its pyridine nitrogen, mimicking the substrate.

Since 2014, galeterone has been in phase III clinical trials for castration-resistant prostate cancer.

Ketoconazole is an older CYP17A1 inhibitor that is now little used. However, ketoconazole competitively inhibits CYP17A1, therefore its effectiveness will depend on the concentration of ketoconazole. This is in contrast to the abiraterone acetate, that permanently (rather than competitively) disables CYP17A1, once it binds to it.

Seviteronel (VT-464) is a novel CYP17A1 inhibitor which is aimed to avoid co-administration of glucocorticoid therapy. In the 2010s, it underwent various phases of clinical studies and preclinical models as a drug against prostate cancer or breast cancer.

== Steroidogenesis ==
Steroidogenesis, showing, at left side, both reactions of 17α-hydroxylase, and both actions of 17, 20 lyase

== Additional images ==
Pregnenolone

17α-Hydroxypregnenolone

Progesterone

17α-Hydroxyprogesterone

Steroid numbering

== See also ==
- Steroidogenic enzyme
- Cytochrome P450 oxidoreductase deficiency
