= List of investigational PMS/PMDD drugs =

Investigational PMS/PMDD drugs

This is a list of investigational PMS/PMDD drugs, or drugs that are currently under development for clinical use for the treatment of premenstrual syndrome (PMS) or premenstrual dysphoric disorder (PMDD) but are not yet approved.

Chemical/generic names are listed first, with developmental code names, synonyms, and brand names in parentheses. The format of list items is "Name (Synonyms) – Mechanism of Action – Indication [Reference]".

This list was last comprehensively updated in March 2026. It is likely to become outdated with time.

== Under development ==
=== Phase 2 ===
- Pyridoxamine (RS-8001) – vitamin B6 and antioxidant – PMS
- Refisolone (ORG-39479; PH-80; PH-80-M; PH80-PMD NS) – vomeropherine / "neurotransmitter receptor modulator" – PMDD
- Sepranolone (isoallopregnanolone; UC-1010) – GABA_{A} receptor negative allosteric modulator and excitatory neurosteroid – PMDD

== Not under development ==
=== No development reported ===
- Ethinylestradiol/drospirenone (dihydrospirorenone/ethinylestradiol; drospirenone/ethinylestradiol; Petibelle; SH-470; Yasmin; ZK-30595) – combination of ethinylestradiol (estrogen) and drospirenone (progestin) – PMS and PMDD
- Progesterone intranasal (MetP Progesterone Nasal Gel; MPP 22; ProgestoMat) – progestogen (progesterone receptor agonist) and GABA_{A} receptor positive allosteric modulator (via metabolites) – PMS
- Progesterone vaginal – progestogen (progesterone receptor agonist) and GABA_{A} receptor positive allosteric modulator (via metabolites) – PMS
- Research programme: premenstrual syndrome therapeutic - Panacor Bioscience (PB301) – undefined mechanism of action – PMS

=== Discontinued ===
- Ethinylestradiol/levonorgestrel continuous (EE/Levo continuous; EE/LNG continuous; Levo/EE continuous; Levonorgestrel/ethinlyestradiol continuous; Librel; LNG/EE continuous; Lybrel) – combination of ethinylestradiol (estrogen) and levonorgestrel (progestin) – PMS and PMDD
- Progesterone transdermal (progesterone spray; Progesterone TDS®) – progestogen (progesterone receptor agonist) and GABA_{A} receptor positive allosteric modulator (via metabolites) – PMS

== Clinically used drugs ==
=== Approved drugs ===
==== Hormonal agents ====
- Ethinylestradiol/drospirenone low-dose (BAY86-5300; BAY86-5300-YAZ-Flex; Drospirenone/ethinylestradiol; EE20/Drospirenone; EE20/DRSP; Ethinylestradiol-Drospirenone 24+4; Flexyess; SH-T-00186D; Yasmin® 20; Yasminelle; Yaz; Yaz 24+4; Yaz Extended Cycle; YAZ Extended Regimen; Yaz Flex; Yvidually) – combination of ethinylestradiol (estrogen) and drospirenone (progestin) – PMS and PMDD
- Ethinylestradiol/drospirenone/levomefolic acid (BAY98-7071; Beyaz; EE20/DRSP/L-5MTHF; ethinylestradiol/drospirenone/methyltetrahydrofolate; Safyral; Yasmin Plus; Yaz Flex Plus; Yaz Plus) – combination of ethinylestradiol (estrogen), drospirenone (progestin), and levomefolic acid (vitamin B9) – PMDD
- Progesterone gel (COL-1620; Crinone; Crinone 4%; Crinone 8%; Crinone8%; OneCrinone; Prochieve; Prochieve4%; Prochieve8%; progesterone vaginal gel 4%; progesterone vaginal gel 8%) – progestogen (progesterone receptor agonist) and GABA_{A} receptor positive allosteric modulator (via metabolites) – PMS
- Progesterone vaginal (Utrogestan) – progestogen (progesterone receptor agonist) and GABA_{A} receptor positive allosteric modulator (via metabolites) – PMS

==== Antidepressants ====
- Fluoxetine (LY-110140; Prozac; Prozac Weekly; Reneuron; Sarafem) – selective serotonin reuptake inhibitor (SSRI) – PMDD
- Paroxetine (Aropax; BRL 29060; BRL 29060A; Deroxat; Divarius; FG 7051; Frosinor; Motivan; NNC 207051; Paxil; Paxil CR; Seroxat; SI 211103; Tagonis) – selective serotonin reuptake inhibitor (SSRI) – PMDD
- Sertraline (Aremis; Besitran; CP 51974; CP 51974 01; Gladem; J Zoloft; Lustral; Serad; Serlain; Tatig; Zoloft) – selective serotonin reuptake inhibitor (SSRI) – PMDD

=== Off-label drugs ===
==== Hormonal agents ====
- 5α-Reductase inhibitors (e.g., dutasteride) (via neurosteroid synthesis inhibition)
- Androgens (androgen receptor agonists) (e.g., danazol)
- GnRH agonists (e.g., leuprorelin) and GnRH antagonists (e.g., elagolix, relugolix) (with or without add-back estrogen–progestogen therapy)
- Neurosteroids acting as GABA_{A} receptor positive allosteric modulators (e.g., brexanolone (allopregnanolone), zuranolone, ganaxolone)
- Other contraceptive and non-contraceptive estrogen–progestogen therapies
- Other progesterone formulations and progestogens
- Selective progesterone receptor modulators (SPRMs) (e.g., ulipristal acetate)
- Spironolactone (Aldactone) – antimineralocorticoid (mineralocorticoid receptor antagonist), other actions

==== Psychiatric medications ====
- Anxiolytics (e.g., benzodiazepines (e.g., alprazolam), buspirone)
- Other selective serotonin reuptake inhibitors (SSRIs) (e.g., citalopram, escitalopram)
- Other serotonergic antidepressants (e.g., venlafaxine, duloxetine, clomipramine)

== See also ==
- List of investigational drugs
- List of investigational sex-hormonal agents
- List of investigational antidepressants
