= Sleep problems in women =

Sleep problems in women can manifest at various stages of their life cycle, as supported by both subjective and objective data. Factors such as hormonal changes, aging, psycho-social aspects, physical and psychological conditions and the presence of sleeping disorders can disrupt women's sleep. Research supports the presence of disturbed sleep during the menstrual cycle, pregnancy, postpartum period, and menopausal transition. The relationship between sleep and women's psychological well-being suggests that the underlying causes of sleep disturbances are often multi-factorial throughout a woman's lifespan.

== Sleep during menstrual cycle ==
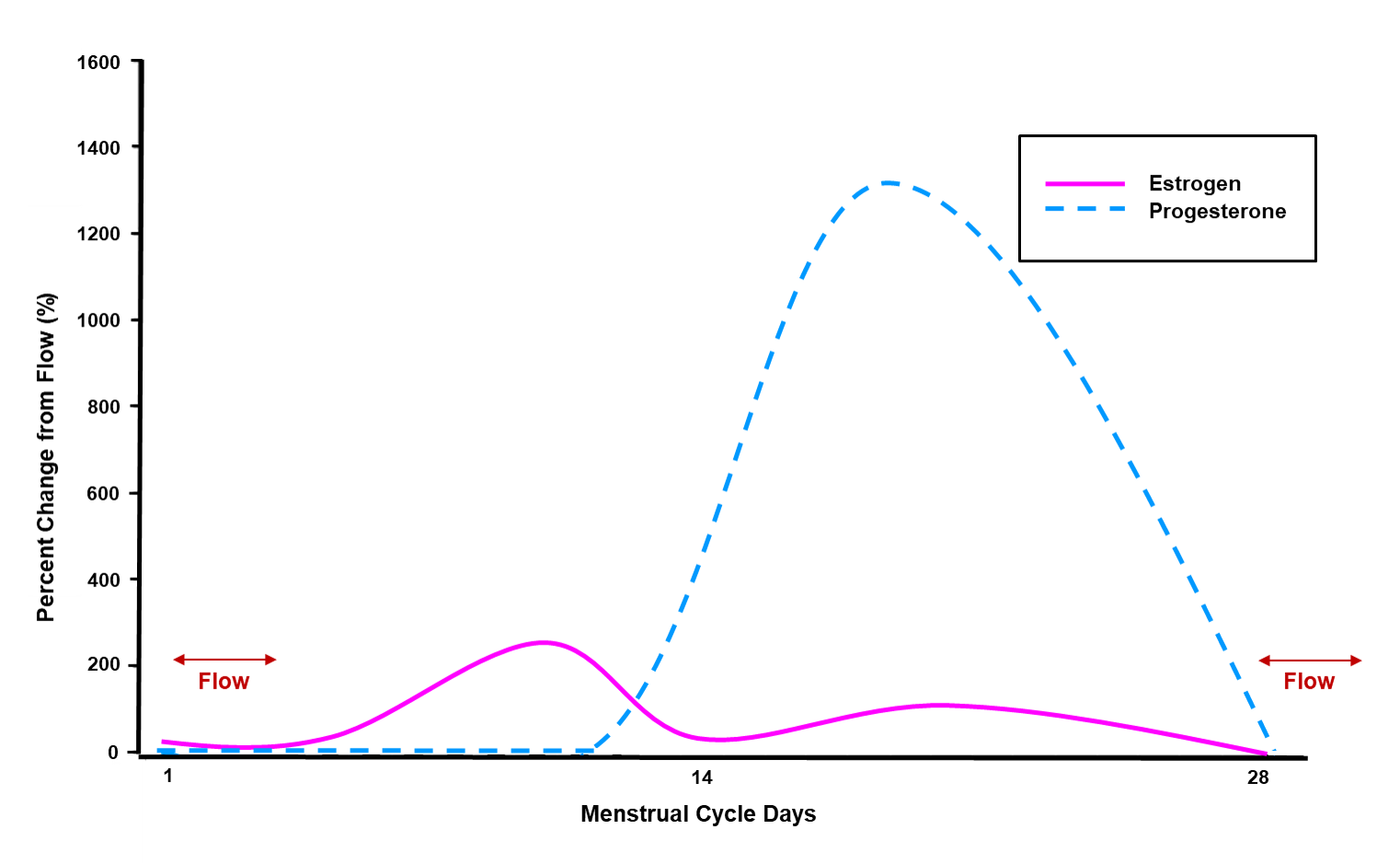
Changes in estrogen and progesterone percentages throughout the menstrual cycle

Initial variations of sleep in women begin with the menstrual cycle. In subjective studies, women who report PMS or PMDD declare increases in poor sleep quality. However, most objective laboratory-based PSG measures of young healthy women do not confirm irregular sleep patterns across the menstrual cycle, neither in sleep duration nor in sleep quality. One exception is the reduction of REM sleep, and markedly more so the increase of Stage 2 sleep during the luteal phase of the menstrual cycle. Several studies attribute this to increased estrogen and progesterone concentrations. One actigraphy study reports a modest decline in total sleep time of 25 min in late-reproductive women during the premenstrual week. The measurement of subjectively reported sleep during the menstrual cycle differs. Seventy percent of women report a negative impact on their sleep. Furthermore, they report a decrease in sleep quality on 2.5 days each month. Poor sleep quality, connected with poor mood and menstrual pain, especially during the premenstrual week, are most likely to be reported. Psychological factors influencing sleep quality in women, such as mood disorders and sleep disorders (related to hormonal fluctuations), are often higher in women after the onset menarche.

== Sleep during pregnancy ==
An estimated 46% of women experience subjectively poor sleep during pregnancy, and this percentage increases progressively up to approximately 78% in the late stages of pregnancy. Reasons vary according to the trimester, related to hormonal changes and physical discomfort: anatomic changes, sleep fragmentation, fragmentation of breathing, metabolic changes which might increase sleep disorders such as restless leg syndrome, gastroesophageal reflux, increase in overnight sodium excretion, changes in the musculoskeletal system, nocturnal uterine contractions, changes in iron and folate metabolism, and changes in the circadian and homeostatic regulation of sleep.

=== First trimester ===
Laboratory-based studies show that most women experience more disruption during night-time sleep. They sleep on average more during this time compared to pre-pregnancy sleep time. Total sleep time, however, decreases as the pregnancy progresses. Nocturia and musculoskeletal discomfort account for the physiological factors impacting sleep during the first trimester. Subjectively, women report an increase in night-time awakening and an increase in total sleep time. Pregnant women's main physiological complaints about the quality of sleep during the first trimester are related to nausea and vomiting, urinary frequency, backaches, and feeling uncomfortable and fatigued; as well as tender breasts, headache, vaginal discharge, flatulence, constipation, shortness of breath, and heartburn. Other contributing factors for sleep quality are age, parity, mood disorders, anxiety and primary sleep disorders.

=== Second trimester ===
Laboratory based measures during the second trimester show a further decrease in total sleep time, slow-wave sleep and sleep quality. No changes in REM sleep have been observed. Fetal movements, uterine contractions, musculoskeletal discomfort and rhinitis and nasal congestion account for the physiological factors influencing sleep. Self-reported total sleep time and quality decreases during the second trimester. Reported contributing factors are fetal movements, heartburn, cramps or tingling in the legs, breathing problems, and anxiety.

=== Third trimester ===
Objectively, slow-wave sleep and total sleep time as well as general sleep quality decreases further progressively during the third trimester. More night-time awakenings are common. Sleep onset latency problems and napping becomes more frequent. Physiological factors impacting sleep at this stage during the pregnancy are nocturia, fetal movement, uterine contractions, heartburn, orthopnea, leg cramps, rhinitis, nasal congestion, and sleeping position. Women at the third trimester report progressively reduced total sleep time, and similarly to the second trimester, being uncomfortable, feeling fetal movements, heartburn, frequent urination, cramps and respiratory difficulties. The last weeks before delivery influence sleep quality most markedly. It is however surprising that in spite of virtually all women experiencing poor sleep, only one third consider themselves to have actual sleep problems.

=== Postpartum ===
Total sleep time is objectively the lowest during the first month postpartum though it steadily increases toward normal values. The main contributing factors influencing sleep during the postpartum period are infant behaviour such as sleep and feeding patterns, bed-sharing and infant temperament. It appears that slow-wave sleep is preserved during the first weeks postpartum in spite and because of chronic sleep deprivation. Frequent napping occurs. Recent studies suggest additionally a myriad of further contributing factors influencing postpartum sleep. It has been found that multiparas sleep remained relatively stable while first time mothers experienced a decline in sleep efficiency. Furthermore, mothers of bottle-fed babies experienced less night-time awakening than breast feeding mothers. The general physical and psychological health of parents should be considered as well. By three months postpartum, mothers' and infants' sleep tend to stabilise and mothers' sleep becomes more regular.

== Menopausal transition ==
Poor sleep quality, sleep fragmentation and increased awakenings are common complaints during the menopausal transition. Reportedly, 31% to 42% of women suffer from chronic insomnia during their menopausal transition. However, some objective PSG studies have not shown significant differences in sleep architecture in pre‐, peri‐, and postmenopausal women. Nonetheless, quantitative and qualitative studies report elevated beta activity, resulting objectively and subjectively in a consistent coupling of sleep disturbances such as sleep fragmentation, increased waking after sleep onset and poor sleep efficiency with vasomotor symptoms such as hot flashes. Besides vasomotor symptoms are changes in hormone levels such as estrogen, affective disorders, stress and perceived health, urinary problems, obesity, gastrointestinal problems, endocrine problems, and cardiovascular problems contributing factors to menopause' associated sleeping problems and insomnia. Sleep during the menopausal transition is furthermore influenced by pain disorders and specifically by comorbid physical and psychiatric conditions. Other proposed causes for sleep problems during menopause are increased incidence of obstructive sleep apnea, increased sleep disordered breathing, and inadequate sleep hygiene. In general, another important factor contributing to changed sleep patterns in ageing women is the circadian disruption, with disturbed regulation of body temperature at sleep onset and early morning cortisol levels. Postmenopausal women tend to express a morning chronotype. These changes in chronotype compared to premenopausal women require a different sleep hygiene.

== See also ==
- Menopause
- Sleep
