= Estradiol/drospirenone =

Combination drug

- Estradiol

- Drospirenone

Combination of
- Estradiol: Estrogen
- Drospirenone: Progestogen; Progestin; Antimineralocorticoid; Antiandrogen

Clinical data
- Trade names: Angeliq
- Other names: E2/DRSP; BAY-864891
- Routes of administration: By mouth
- Drug class: Estrogen; Progestin; Progestogen; Antimineralocorticoid; Antiandrogen

Legal status
- Legal status: US: ℞-only

Identifiers
- CAS Number: 350818-73-4

Estradiol/drospirenone (E2/DRSP), sold under the brand name Angeliq, is a combination of estradiol (E2), an estrogen, and drospirenone (DRSP), a progestin, antimineralocorticoid, and antiandrogen, which is used in menopausal hormone therapy, specifically the treatment of menopausal syndrome and osteoporosis, in postmenopausal women. It is taken by mouth and contains 0.5 to 1 mg E2 and 0.25 to 0.5 mg DRSP per tablet. The medication was approved in the United States in 2005. It is marketed widely throughout the world.

== See also ==
- Estetrol/drospirenone
- Ethinylestradiol/drospirenone
- Ethinylestradiol/drospirenone/levomefolic acid
- Ethinylestradiol/drospirenone/prasterone
- List of combined sex-hormonal preparations § Estrogens and progestogens
