= Ethinylestradiol/drospirenone =

Combination drug

- Ethinylestradiol

- Drospirenone

Combination of
- Ethinylestradiol: Estrogen
- Drospirenone: Progestogen; Progestin; Antimineralocorticoid; Antiandrogen

Clinical data
- Trade names: With 30 μg ethinylestradiol: Yasmin, others With 20 μg ethinylestradiol: Yaz, Yasminelle, others
- Other names: EE/DRSP; drospirenone/estradiol; drospirenone/ethinyl estradiol
- AHFS/Drugs.com: Professional Drug Facts
- MedlinePlus: a601050
- License data: US DailyMed: Drospirenone and estradiol
- Pregnancy category: AU: B3
- Routes of administration: By mouth
- ATC code: G03FA17 (WHO)

Legal status
- Legal status: AU: S4 (Prescription only); US: ℞-only

Identifiers
- CAS Number: 164017-31-6
- KEGG: D09741

Ethinylestradiol/drospirenone (EE/DRSP), sold under the brand name Yasmin among others, is a combination of ethinylestradiol (EE), an estrogen, and drospirenone (DRSP), a progestin, antimineralocorticoid, and antiandrogen, which is used as a birth control pill to prevent pregnancy in women. It is also indicated for the treatment of moderate acne, premenstrual syndrome (PMS), premenstrual dysphoric disorder (PMDD), and dysmenorrhea (painful menstruation) in women. The medication is taken by mouth and contains 30 μg EE and 3 mg DRSP per tablet (brand names Yasmin, others) or 20 μg EE and 3 mg DRSP per tablet (brand names Yaz, Yasminelle, Nikki, others). A formulation with levomefolic acid (vitamin B_{9}) has also been marketed (brand names Beyaz, Safyral, others), with similar indications. EE/DRSP is marketed widely throughout the world.

In 2023, it was the 154th most commonly prescribed medication in the United States, with more than 3 million prescriptions.

== See also ==
- Ethinylestradiol/drospirenone/levomefolic acid
- Ethinylestradiol/drospirenone/prasterone
- Estradiol/drospirenone
- List of combined sex-hormonal preparations § Estrogens and progestogens
