= 6α-Methyl-17α-bromoprogesterone =

Chemical compound

Clinical data
- Other names: 6α-Methyl-17α-bromopregn-4-en-3,20-dione

Identifiers
- CAS Number: 83583-36-2
- PubChem CID: 165360209
- ChemSpider: 129562380
- CompTox Dashboard (EPA): DTXSID101337001

Chemical and physical data
- Formula: C_{22}H_{31}BrO_{2}
- Molar mass: 407.392 g·mol^{−1}
- 3D model (JSmol): Interactive image
- SMILES: C[C@H]1C[C@H]2[C@@H]3CC[C@](Br)(C(C)=O)[C@@]3(C)CC[C@@H]2[C@@]2(C)CCC(=O)C=C12
- InChI: InChI=1S/C22H31BrO2/c1-13-11-16-17(20(3)8-5-15(25)12-19(13)20)6-9-21(4)18(16)7-10-22(21,23)14(2)24/h12-13,16-18H,5-11H2,1-4H3/t13-,16+,17-,18-,20?,21?,22-/m0/s1; Key:IMDRZPLSTNEVLC-RVGMEUFLSA-N

6α-Methyl-17α-bromoprogesterone is a steroidal progestin related to haloprogesterone (6α-fluoro-17α-bromoprogesterone) that was described in 1963 and was never marketed.

== See also ==
- 17α-Bromoprogesterone
