= Drospirenone/ethinylestradiol/levomefolic acid =

Pharmaceutical combination

- Ethinylestradiol

- Drospirenone

Combination of
- Drospirenone: Progestogen; Progestin; Antimineralocorticoid; Antiandrogen
- Ethinylestradiol: Estrogen
- Levomefolic acid: Vitamin

Clinical data
- Trade names: Beyaz, Safyral, Tydemy
- Other names: EE/DRSP/LMF; EE/DRSP/THF; EE/DRSP/THFA; EE/DRSP/FH4; EE/DRSP/VB9
- MedlinePlus: a601050
- License data: US DailyMed: Drospirenone, ethinyl estradiol and levomefolate calcium
- Routes of administration: By mouth

Legal status
- Legal status: In general: ℞ (Prescription only)

Identifiers
- ChemSpider: None
- KEGG: D12130

Drospirenone/ethinylestradiol/levomefolic acid (EE/DRSP/LMF), sold under the brand name Beyaz among others, is a combination of ethinylestradiol (EE), an estrogen, drospirenone (DRSP), a progestogen, antimineralocorticoid, and antiandrogen, and levomefolic acid (LMF), a form of vitamin B_{9}, which is used as a birth control pill to prevent pregnancy in women. The formulation contains folate as the calcium salt of levomefolic acid to lower the risk of complications such as fetal neural tube defects should the medication fail as a form of birth control. EE/DRSP/LMF was approved for use by the US Food and Drug Administration (FDA) in September 2010.

In 2022, it was the 285th most commonly prescribed medication in the United States, with more than 500,000 prescriptions.

== Medical uses ==
Studies have shown its uses to be oral contraception, lessening premenstrual dysphoric disorder (PMDD), and treatment of moderate acne in women over 14 years of age who choose an oral contraceptive for contraception. Five clinical trials were carried out for these labeled uses, “including a one-year contraceptive efficacy study, two 3-cycle studies in women with premenstrual dysphoric disorder (PMDD), and two 6-cycle studies in women with moderate acne.” The drug combination will also increase folate levels due to its extra ingredient, levomefolic calcium. This is equivalent to folic acid 0.4 mg and will help prevent neural tube defects in case of accidental pregnancy while taking, or shortly after stopping the drug.

=== Dosage and use ===
Each box, as supplied by the manufacturer, contains three blister packs of 28 tablets packaged in individual boxes. Each blister pack of 28 tablets contains 24 pink active pills containing drospirenone 3 mg, ethinylestradiol 20 mcg, and levomefolate calcium 0.451 mg and four light orange inactive pills containing levomefolate calcium 0.451 mg.

One tablet is taken by mouth at the same time every day. The failure rate may increase when pills are missed or taken incorrectly. Single missed pills should be taken as soon as remembered. It is important to know that when experiencing stomach upset in the form of diarrhea or vomiting (within 3–4 hours of taking), backup contraception methods should be utilized to account for possible absorption failure.

== Side effects ==
Adverse reactions commonly reported by combined oral contraceptive users are irregular uterine bleeding, nausea, breast tenderness, and headache.

== Interactions ==
=== Decreased efficacy ===
Drugs or herbal products that induce certain enzymes, including CYP3A4, may decrease the effectiveness of COCs or increase breakthrough bleeding. Some drugs or herbal products that may decrease the effectiveness of hormonal contraceptives include phenytoin, barbiturates, carbamazepine, bosentan, felbamate, griseofulvin, oxcarbazepine, rifampicin, topiramate and products containing St. John’s wort. Interactions between oral contraceptives and other drugs may lead to breakthrough bleeding and/or contraceptive failure.” “Use an alternative method of contraception or a back-up method when enzyme inducers are used with COCs, and to continue back-up contraception for 28 days after discontinuing the enzyme inducer to ensure contraceptive reliability.CYP3A4 inhibitors such as itraconazole or ketoconazole may increase plasma hormone levels.”

=== Antivirals ===
‘Significant changes (increase or decrease) in the plasma levels of estrogen and progestin have been noted in some cases of co-administration with HIV protease inhibitors or with non-nucleoside reverse transcriptase inhibitors.”

=== Antibiotics ===
“There have been reports of pregnancy while taking hormonal contraceptives and antibiotics, but clinical pharmacokinetic studies have not shown consistent effects of antibiotics on plasma concentrations of synthetic steroids.”

=== Others ===
“COCs containing EE may inhibit the metabolism of other compounds. COCs have been shown to significantly decrease plasma concentrations of lamotrigine. This may reduce seizure control; therefore, dosage adjustments of lamotrigine may be necessary.”

== Pharmacology ==
Combined oral contraceptives reduce the risk of pregnancy primarily by inhibiting ovulation. This product combines drospirenone, an analogue of spironolactone that has both antimineralocorticoid and antiandrogenic effects with an estrogen plus folate supplementation. Levomefolate calcium 0.451 mg is included for reducing the risk of neural tube defects in case of accidental pregnancy.

== History ==
EE/DRSP/LMF is the first and only birth control approved by the FDA for four indications: pregnancy prevention, symptomatic treatment of premenstrual dysphoric disorder, treatment of moderate acne, and raising folate levels to prevent neural tube defects for women who chose an oral contraceptive method.

== See also ==
- Birth control pill formulations
- Ethinylestradiol/drospirenone
- Estradiol/drospirenone
- Ethinylestradiol/drospirenone/prasterone
- List of combined sex-hormonal preparations
