= Menstrual leave =

Leave of absence taken during a menstrual period

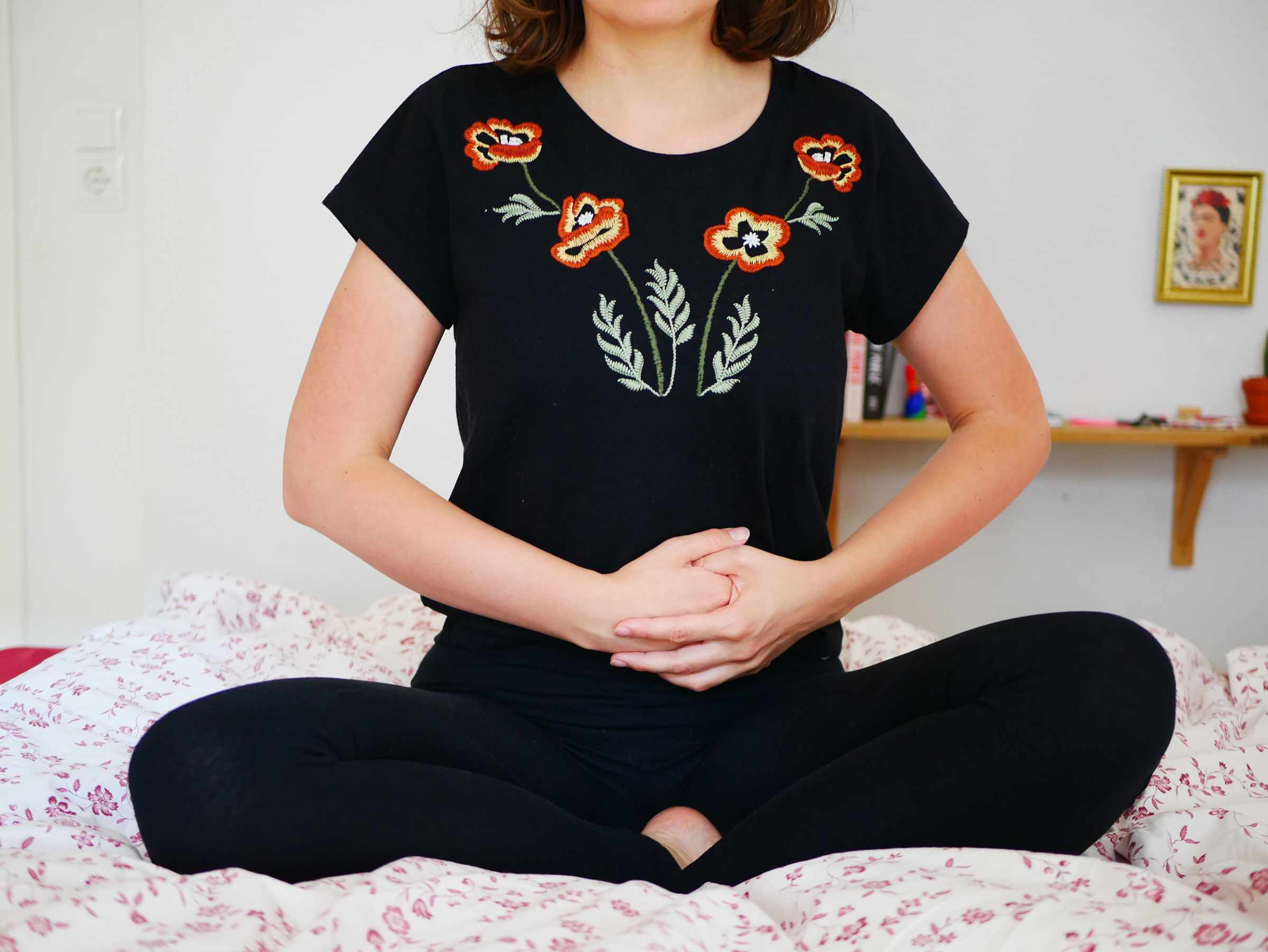
experiencing menstrual pain

Menstrual leave is a type of leave where a woman may have the option to take paid or unpaid leave from her employment if she is menstruating and is unable to go to work because of this. Throughout its history, menstrual leave has been associated with controversy and discrimination against men, with very few countries enacting policies. In these countries, menstrual leave is still associated with low uptake. It is seen by some as a criticism of women's work efficiency or as sexism against men. Supporters of menstrual leave policies compare its function to that of maternity leave and view it as a promoter of gender equality.

== Background ==
Many women experience a condition called dysmenorrhea that causes pain during menstruation. Up to 60% of women experience problems sufficient to disrupt daily functioning as a result of menstruation, and some may report having some issues prior to menstruation. Symptoms interfere with normal life, qualifying as premenstrual syndrome, in 20–30% of women. In 3–8%, symptoms are severe. Premenstrual dysphoric disorder (PMDD) is a severe and disabling form of premenstrual syndrome affecting 1.8–5.8% of menstruating women.

=== History ===
A menstrual leave policy was first applied in some job sectors in post-Revolutionary Russia at the turn of the 20th century. However, because of the resulting discrimination against female workers, the policy was removed in 1927.

A girls' school in the south Indian state of Kerala had granted its students menstrual leave as early as 1912.

In the 1920s, Japanese labor unions started to demand leave (seiri kyuka) for their female workers. In 1947, a law was brought into force by the Japanese Labor Standards that allowed menstruating women to take days off work. Debate continues as to whether it is a medical necessity or a discriminatory measure.

=== Challenges ===
There is a stigma related to menstrual leave. According to Levitt and Barnack-Tavlaris (2020), it may perpetuate stereotypes and further the medicalization of menstruation. Taking leave may require telling managers who are males about something the woman believes to be a personal issue. It may portray women as less able than men and could, therefore, lead to further discrimination against women. One suggestion to remove the stigma is to provide additional medical leave for people of all genders.

== By region ==
=== Asia ===
In Indonesia, under the Labor Act No. 13 in 2003, women have a right to two days of menstrual leave per month, though these are not additional leaves.

In Japan, since 1947, Article 68 of the Labour Standards Law states "When a woman for whom work during menstrual periods would be specially difficult has requested leave, the employer shall not employ such woman on days of the menstrual period." While Japanese law requires that a woman going through especially difficult menstruation be allowed to take leave, it does not require companies to provide paid leave or extra pay for women who choose to work during menstruation.

In South Korea, female employees are entitled to menstrual leave according to Article 71 of the Labour Standards Law, and are ensured additional pay if they do not take the menstrual leave that they are entitled to.

In Taiwan, the Act of Gender Equality in Employment gives women three days of "menstrual leave" per year, which will not be calculated toward the 30 days of "common sick leave", giving women up to 33 days of "health-related leaves" per year. The extra three days do not come with half-pays once a woman employee exceeds the regulated 30.

=== Europe ===
In Europe, as of 2023, there was one country, Spain, with national menstrual leave. Since February 2023, Spain has provided three to five days per month of paid menstrual leave.

A proposal by the Italian Parliament to introduce a menstrual leave policy in 2017 sparked debate in Europe on how menstrual health impacts women in the workforce. The bill would have introduced a policy for companies to offer three days paid leave to women who suffer severe menstrual cramps; the policy was not enacted.

=== Africa ===
In Zambia, as of 2015, women are legally entitled to a day off each month due to their menstrual leave policy, known as "Mother's Day". If a woman employee is denied this entitlement, she can rightfully prosecute her employer.

== Corporate policies ==
Coexist, a Bristol community interest firm, introduced a "period policy" in order to give women more flexibility and a healthier work environment. Hoping to break down the menstruation taboo, Coexist became the first company in the United Kingdom to implement this policy.

Nike has been widely reported as supporting menstrual leave wherever it operates, but this policy was misrepresented by the media; Nike follows the local labor laws where it operates.
