= Promegestone =

Chemical compound

Clinical data
- Trade names: Surgestone
- Other names: PMG; R-5020; RU-5020; 17α,21-Dimethyl-δ^{9}-19-norprogesterone; 17α,21-Dimethyl-19-norpregna-4,9-diene-3,20-dione
- Routes of administration: By mouth
- Drug class: Progestogen; Progestin
- ATC code: G03DB07 (WHO)

Pharmacokinetic data
- Protein binding: To albumin
- Metabolism: Liver (hydroxylation)
- Metabolites: • Trimegestone
- Elimination half-life: Promegestone: ? Trimegestone: 13.8–15.6 hours

Identifiers
- IUPAC name: (8S,13S,14S,17S)-13,17-dimethyl-17-propionyl-1,2,6,7,8,11,12,13,14,15,16,17-dodecahydro-3H-cyclopenta[a]phenanthren-3-one
- CAS Number: 34184-77-5
- PubChem CID: 36709
- ChemSpider: 33716
- UNII: 9XE0V2SQYX
- KEGG: D08431
- ChEBI: CHEBI:73390
- ChEMBL: ChEMBL196003
- CompTox Dashboard (EPA): DTXSID4036510
- ECHA InfoCard: 100.207.681

Chemical and physical data
- Formula: C_{22}H_{30}O_{2}
- Molar mass: 326.480 g·mol^{−1}
- 3D model (JSmol): Interactive image
- SMILES: CCC(=O)[C@]1(CC[C@@H]2[C@@]1(CCC3=C4CCC(=O)C=C4CC[C@@H]23)C)C
- InChI: InChI=1S/C22H30O2/c1-4-20(24)22(3)12-10-19-18-7-5-14-13-15(23)6-8-16(14)17(18)9-11-21(19,22)2/h13,18-19H,4-12H2,1-3H3/t18-,19+,21+,22-/m1/s1; Key:QFFCYTLOTYIJMR-XMGTWHOFSA-N

Promegestone, sold under the brand name Surgestone, is a progestin medication which is used in menopausal hormone therapy and in the treatment of gynecological disorders. It is taken by mouth.

Side effects of promegestone include menstrual irregularities among others. Promegestone is a progestin, or a synthetic progestogen, and hence is an agonist of the progesterone receptor, the biological target of progestogens like progesterone. It has weak antiandrogenic, glucocorticoid, and antimineralocorticoid activity and no other important hormonal activity. The medication is largely a prodrug of trimegestone.

Promegestone was first described in 1973 and was introduced for medical use in France in 1983. It has only been marketed in a few countries, including France, Portugal, Tunisia, and Argentina. In addition to its use as a medication, promegestone has been widely used in scientific research as a radioligand of the progesterone receptor.

== Medical uses ==
Promegestone is used in menopausal hormone therapy and in the treatment of gynecological conditions caused by luteal insufficiency, including premenopausal disorders, dysmenorrhea and other menstrual disorders, and premenstrual syndrome. It has also been used to treat benign breast disorders such as mastalgia (breast pain). Promegestone tablets have a contraceptive effect and are used as a form of progestogen-only birth control, although it is not specifically licensed as such.

== Side effects ==
Side effects of promegestone include menstrual irregularities among others. It has no androgenic side effects.

== Pharmacology ==
=== Pharmacodynamics ===
Trimegestone (21(S)-hydroxyl-promegestone), the major active metabolite of promegestone.

Promegestone is a progestogen, or an agonist of the progesterone receptor. It has about 200% of the affinity of progesterone for the PR. The endometrial transformation dosage of promegestone is 10 mg per cycle and its ovulation-inhibiting dosage is 0.5 mg/day. Promegestone has weak glucocorticoid activity in addition to its progestogenic activity. Conversely, it has no androgenic, estrogenic, mineralocorticoid, or other hormonal activity. It appears to possess antiandrogenic activity. Its major metabolite trimegestone has weak antimineralocorticoid and antiandrogenic activity. In addition, promegestone has been found to possess some neurosteroid activity by acting as a non-competitive antagonist of the nicotinic acetylcholine receptor, similarly to progesterone.

=== Pharmacokinetics ===
Following oral administration, peak serum levels of promegestone are reached after 1 to 2 hours. The medication is mainly bound to albumin; it does not bind to sex hormone-binding globulin, and binds only weakly to corticosteroid-binding globulin. The metabolism of promegestone is mainly via hydroxylation at the C21 position and at other positions. Progesterone is similarly hydroxylated at the C21 position, into 11-deoxycorticosterone (21-hydroxyprogesterone). However, the C9(10) double bond of promegestone greatly limits the A-ring reduction that progesterone undergoes, resulting in 21-hydroxylation being the main route of metabolism for promegestone. The medication is stereoselectively metabolized into trimegestone, the 21(S)-hydroxy metabolite, which is the main compound found in plasma; it circulates at levels approximately twice those of promegestone itself. In addition, trimegestone has more than three-fold higher affinity for the PR than does promegestone. As such, promegestone is largely a prodrug of trimegestone. A second metabolite, 21(R)-hydroxypromegestone, circulates at far lower concentrations (AUC ratio for the (S)- and (R)-isomers of about 21). The elimination half-life of trimegestone is 13.8 to 15.6 hours. Promegestone, trimegestone, and 21(R)-hydroxypromegestone are not excreted in urine, while 3% of a dose is recovered as the glucuronide and/or sulfate conjugate of trimegestone and 1% of a dose is recovered as the glucuronide and/or sulfate conjugate of 21(R)-hydroxypromegestone.

== Chemistry ==
Promegestone, also known as 17α,21-dimethyl-δ^{9}-19-norprogesterone or as 17α,21-dimethyl-19-norpregna-4,9-diene-3,20-dione, is a synthetic norpregnane steroid and a derivative of progesterone. It is specifically a combined derivative of 17α-methylprogesterone and 19-norprogesterone, or of 17α-methyl-19-norprogesterone. Related derivatives of 17α-methyl-19-norprogesterone include demegestone and trimegestone.

== History ==
Promegestone was first described in the literature in 1973 and was introduced for medical use in France in 1983. It was developed by Roussel Uclaf in France.

== Society and culture ==
=== Generic names ===
Promegestone is the generic name of the drug and its INN, while promégestone is its DCF. It is also known by its developmental code name R-5020 or RU-5020.

=== Brand names ===
Promegestone is marketed exclusively under the brand name Surgestone.

=== Availability ===
Promegestone is or has been marketed in France, Portugal, Tunisia, and Argentina.
