= Paula Caplan =

Psychologist and psychiatric patient advocate (1947–2021)

- Born: Paula Joan Caplan; July 7, 1947; Springfield, Missouri, U.S.
- Died: July 21, 2021 (aged 74); Rockville, Maryland, U.S.
- Education: Radcliffe College (AB); Duke University (MA, PhD)
- Known for: Advocacy for psychiatric survivors, veterans, and victims of violence. Critical thinking about psychological research, clinical work, and social policy.
- Awards: Institute on Violence, Abuse, and Trauma Lifetime Achievement Award; Association for Women in Psychology Lifetime Achievement Award; Association of American Publishers first place award for Professional and Scholarly Excellence in Psychology category; Independent Publisher IPPY Award for Groundbreaking Book of the Month; Independent Publishers Silver Medal for Psychology Books; Christine Ladd-Franklin Award
- Scientific career
- Fields: Psychology, Advocacy, Critical Thinking, Social Policy
- Workplaces: DuBois Institute, Harvard University

Paula Joan Caplan (July 7, 1947 – July 21, 2021) was an American psychologist and author who pioneered the feminist critique of psychology. She served on the American Psychiatric Association's committee for the fourth edition of the Diagnostic and Statistical Manual of Mental Disorders (DSM-IV), but resigned over the inclusion of "premenstrual dysphoric disorder" (PMDD) and "self-defeating personality disorder" (SDPD), which she believed unscientifically pathologized female traits.

== Biography ==
Paula was born on July 7, 1947, in Springfield, Missouri, to Jerome and Theda Ann Caplan. Her father was a businessman, and her mother was a clinical psychologist.

Caplan attended Radcliffe College, the female counterpart to Harvard, where she intended to become a journalist. There she became more interested in psychological analysis, and after graduating with an A.B., went on to receive a Masters and Doctorate in psychology from Duke University. In 1974, she moved to Toronto after her husband, Marcel Kinsbourne, found a job there. They divorced in 1978.

After moving to Canada, Dr. Caplan was a psychologist for the Toronto Family Court. From 1979 to 1995, she was a professor at the University of Toronto and served as head of its Center for Women's Studies in Education from 1985 to 1987. She also taught at American University, the University of Rhode Island, Brown University, and Harvard. Caplan was an associate at Harvard University's DuBois Institute, director of the Voices of Diversity Project, and a past Fellow at the Women and Public Policy Program of the John F. Kennedy School of Government at Harvard.

In 1988, Caplan joined two DSM-IV committees but resigned due to disagreements about the unscientific nature of diagnostic labels, particularly "self-defeating personality disorder" and "premenstrual dysphoric disorder." Caplan believed these labels pathologized female traits, and in protest, she proposed the DSM include a new diagnosis, "delusional dominating personality disorder," pathologizing male traits. Symptoms of this disorder include the "inability to identify and express a range of feelings" and "delusion that physical force is the best method of solving interpersonal problems."

Caplan has done more than 1,000 media interviews as part of her activism and given over 400 invited addresses. In addition to her academic pursuits, Caplan has acted in commercials and had small roles in TV shows. She has written plays and directed documentary films, including Isaac Pope: The Spirit of an American Century (2019), about a black WWII veteran and his fight against oppression.

Paula Caplan died on July 21, 2021, in Rockville, Maryland, from metastatic melanoma.

== Career ==
Since the late 1970s, Caplan was highly critical of the field of psychology, diagnostic labels, and psychoanalytic theory. While working as a psychologist at the Toronto Family Court, Caplan challenged the work of Erik Erikson, a German American psychologist who concluded that boys are innately more assertive than girls. Caplan organized a study with young children that demonstrated otherwise, suggesting gendered socialization, not biology, made girls behave less assertively than boys.

In her 1984 essay and subsequent book titled The Myth of Women's Masochism, Caplan disputed Sigmund Freud's claim that women are inherently masochistic and take pleasure in frustration and guilt. Caplan argued that most women get no pleasure from such pain, and this frustration and guilt are the result of an unfair patriarchal society.

In her 1995 book, They Say You’re Crazy: How the World's most Powerful Psychiatrists Decide Who’s Normal, Caplan discusses the nature of diagnosis and how the DSM contributes to the unique faults of psychiatry. She sought to educate the public about the unregulated nature of psychiatric diagnoses and the consequent lack of recourse for people who have been harmed by getting such labels.

Her final book, When Johnny and Jane Come Marching Home: How All of Us Can Help Veterans, won the 2011 American Publishers Award for Professional and Scholarly Excellence in the Psychology category.

=== Publications ===
Caplan has authored eleven books.

- When Johnny and Jane Come Marching Home: How All of Us Can Help Veterans (2011)
- Bias in Psychiatric Diagnosis (2004) (co-edited with Lisa Cosgrove)
- Gender Differences in Human Cognition (1997) (co-authored with Mary Crawford, Janet Hyde, and John Richardson)
- They Say You’re Crazy: How the World’s Most Powerful Psychiatrists Decide Who’s Normal (1995)
- You’re Smarter Than They Make You Feel: How the Experts Intimidate Us and What We Can Do About It (1994)
- Thinking Critically About Research on Sex and Gender (1994) (co-authored with her son, Jeremy B. Caplan)
- Lifting a Ton of Feathers: A Woman's Guide to Surviving in the Academic World (1993)
- Don't Blame Mother: Mending the Mother-Daughter Relationship (1989)
- The Myth of Women's Masochism (1985)
- Between Women: Lowering the Barriers (1981) (originally "Barriers Between Women")
- Children's Learning and Attention Problems (1979) (co-authored with Marcel Kinsbourne)

== See also ==
- James Gottstein
- David Oaks
- Elyn Saks
- R. D. Laing
