= Haloprogesterone =

Chemical compound

Clinical data
- Trade names: Prohalone
- Other names: Aloprogesterone; 6α-Fluoro-17α-bromoprogesterone; 6α-Fluoro-17α-bromopregn-4-ene-3,20-dione
- Routes of administration: By mouth
- Drug class: Progestogen; Progestin
- ATC code: None

Identifiers
- IUPAC name: (6S,8R,9S,10R,13S,14S,17R)-17-acetyl-17-bromo-6-fluoro-10,13-dimethyl-2,6,7,8,9,11,12,14,15,16-decahydro-1H-cyclopenta[a]phenanthren-3-one
- CAS Number: 3538-57-6
- PubChem CID: 20056569
- ChemSpider: 16735842
- UNII: 803BIX5JG5
- KEGG: D04414
- ChEMBL: ChEMBL2104328
- CompTox Dashboard (EPA): DTXSID10188868

Chemical and physical data
- Formula: C_{21}H_{28}BrFO_{2}
- Molar mass: 411.355 g·mol^{−1}
- 3D model (JSmol): Interactive image
- SMILES: CC(=O)[C@@]1(CC[C@@H]2[C@@]1(CC[C@H]3[C@H]2C[C@@H](C4=CC(=O)CC[C@]34C)F)C)Br
- InChI: InChI=1S/C21H28BrFO2/c1-12(24)21(22)9-6-16-14-11-18(23)17-10-13(25)4-7-19(17,2)15(14)5-8-20(16,21)3/h10,14-16,18H,4-9,11H2,1-3H3/t14-,15+,16+,18+,19-,20+,21-/m1/s1; Key:GCCIFDUTISMRTG-TUPTUZDRSA-N

Haloprogesterone, sold under the brand name Prohalone, is a progestin medication which was previously marketed by Ayerst but is now no longer available.

== Chemistry ==
Haloprogesterone, also known as 6α-fluoro-17α-bromoprogesterone or as 6α-fluoro-17α-bromopregn-4-ene-3,20-dione, is a synthetic pregnane steroid and a halogenated derivative of progesterone. It is specifically a derivative of 17α-bromoprogesterone and is similar structurally to medrogestone (6-dehydro-6,17α-dimethylprogesterone), medroxyprogesterone acetate (6α-methyl-17α-acetoxyprogesterone), and various other progestins derived from progesterone.

=== Synthesis ===
Chemical syntheses of haloprogesterone have been published.

== History ==
Haloprogesterone was synthesized in 1960 and was introduced for medical use by 1961.

== Society and culture ==
=== Generic names ===
Haloprogesterone is the generic name of the drug and its INN and USAN.

=== Brand names ===
Haloprogesterone was marketed under the brand name Prohalone.
