= 17α-Methylprogesterone =

Chemical compound

Clinical data
- Other names: 17α-MP; 17α-Methylpregn-4-ene-3,20-dione
- Drug class: Progestin; Progestogen

Identifiers
- IUPAC name: (8R,9S,10R,13S,14S,17S)-17-acetyl-10,13,17-trimethyl-2,6,7,8,9,11,12,14,15,16-decahydro-1H-cyclopenta[a]phenanthren-3-one
- CAS Number: 1046-28-2
- PubChem CID: 101951
- ChemSpider: 92105
- UNII: TYW2G0D7NC
- CompTox Dashboard (EPA): DTXSID30909052

Chemical and physical data
- Formula: C_{22}H_{32}O_{2}
- Molar mass: 328.496 g·mol^{−1}
- 3D model (JSmol): Interactive image
- SMILES: CC(=O)C1(CCC2C1(CCC3C2CCC4=CC(=O)CCC34C)C)C
- InChI: InChI=1S/C22H32O2/c1-14(23)21(3)11-9-19-17-6-5-15-13-16(24)7-10-20(15,2)18(17)8-12-22(19,21)4/h13,17-19H,5-12H2,1-4H3/t17-,18+,19+,20+,21-,22+/m1/s1; Key:UFIQEZHBGZCWRS-QZKGNRECSA-N

17α-Methylprogesterone (17α-MP), or 17α-methylpregn-4-ene-3,20-dione, is a steroidal progestin related to progesterone that was synthesized and characterized in 1949 but was never marketed. Along with ethisterone (1938) and 19-norprogesterone (1951), 17α-MP was one of the earliest derivatives of progesterone to be identified as possessing progestogenic activity. Similarly to progesterone and derivatives like 17α-hydroxyprogesterone and 19-norprogesterone, 17α-MP was found to possess poor (though not negligible) oral bioavailability, but showed improved progestogenic activity relative to progesterone when administered via other routes (e.g., subcutaneous or vaginal). In addition to its activity as a progestogen, 17α-MP has also been found to possess some antiglucocorticoid activity.

The observation of two-fold improved potency of 17α-MP relative to progesterone led to renewed interest in 17α-substituted derivatives of progesterone. Subsequently, hydroxyprogesterone acetate and hydroxyprogesterone caproate were synthesized in 1953 and introduced in 1956 and 1957, respectively, and medroxyprogesterone acetate was discovered in 1957 and introduced in 1959. In addition, though 17α-MP itself was never introduced for medical use, progestogen derivatives of the compound, including medrogestone (1966) and the 19-norprogesterone derivatives demegestone (1974), promegestone (1983), and trimegestone (2001), have been marketed.

== See also ==
- 17α-Bromoprogesterone
- Ethinylestradiol
- Methylestradiol
- Methyltestosterone
