= Trimegestone =

Chemical compound

Clinical data
- Trade names: Ginotex, Lovelle, Minique, Ondeva, Totelle, others
- Other names: TMG; RU-27987; 21(S)-Hydroxypromegestone; 21β-Hydroxypromegestone; 21(S)-Hydroxy-17α,21-dimethyl-9-dehydro-19-norprogesterone; 21(S)-Hydroxy-17α,21-dimethyl-19-norpregna-4,9-dien-3,20-dione; 17β-(S)-Lactoyl-17α-methylestra-4,9-dien-3-one; 17β-((S)-2-Hydroxypropanoyl)-17α-methylestra-4,9-dien-3-one
- Routes of administration: By mouth
- Drug class: Progestogen; Progestin
- ATC code: G03FA16 (WHO)

Legal status
- Legal status: In general: ℞ (Prescription only)

Pharmacokinetic data
- Bioavailability: 100%
- Protein binding: 98% (to albumin)
- Metabolism: Mainly hydroxylation
- Elimination half-life: Range: 12–20 hours Mean: 13.8–15.6 hours

Identifiers
- IUPAC name: (8S,13S,14S,17S)-17-[(2S)-2-hydroxypropanoyl]-13,17-dimethyl-1,2,6,7,8,11,12,13,14,15,16,17-dodecahydro-3H-cyclopenta[a]phenanthren-3-one
- CAS Number: 74513-62-5
- PubChem CID: 68926
- DrugBank: DB13129
- ChemSpider: 62152
- UNII: 4658K0H08W
- KEGG: D06235
- ChEBI: CHEBI:136027
- ChEMBL: ChEMBL2104765
- CompTox Dashboard (EPA): DTXSID201317995
- ECHA InfoCard: 100.189.099

Chemical and physical data
- Formula: C_{22}H_{30}O_{3}
- Molar mass: 342.479 g·mol^{−1}
- 3D model (JSmol): Interactive image
- SMILES: C[C@@H](C(=O)[C@]1(CC[C@@H]2[C@@]1(CCC3=C4CCC(=O)C=C4CC[C@@H]23)C)C)O
- InChI: InChI=1S/C22H30O3/c1-13(23)20(25)22(3)11-9-19-18-6-4-14-12-15(24)5-7-16(14)17(18)8-10-21(19,22)2/h12-13,18-19,23H,4-11H2,1-3H3/t13-,18+,19-,21-,22+/m0/s1; Key:JUNDJWOLDSCTFK-MTZCLOFQSA-N

Trimegestone, sold under the brand names Ondeva and Totelle among others, is a progestin medication which is used in menopausal hormone therapy and in the prevention of postmenopausal osteoporosis. It was also under development for use in birth control pills to prevent pregnancy, but ultimately was not marketed for this purpose. The medication is available alone or in combination with an estrogen. It is taken by mouth.

Side effects of trimegestone include headache, breast tenderness, nervousness, abdominal pain, bloating, muscle cramps, nausea, depression, and vaginal bleeding among others. Trimegestone is a progestin, or a synthetic progestogen, and hence is an agonist of the progesterone receptor, the biological target of progestogens like progesterone. It has weak antiandrogenic and antimineralocorticoid activity and no other important hormonal activity.

Trimegestone was first described in 1979 and was introduced for medical use in 2001. It is sometimes described as a "fourth-generation" progestin. The medication is marketed throughout Europe and Latin America. It is not available in the United States or Canada.

== Medical uses ==
Trimegestone is used in menopausal hormone therapy in the treatment of menopausal symptoms such as hot flashes and vaginal atrophy and in the prevention of postmenopausal osteoporosis.

=== Available forms ===
Trimegestone is available both alone (as Ondeva) and in combination with estradiol (as Ginotex, Lovelle, Minique, Totelle), both of which are approved for the treatment of menopausal symptoms and prevention of postmenopausal osteoporosis. Preparations of trimegestone are oral tablets and contain 0.1 to 0.5 mg of the medication.

== Side effects ==
The most common side effects of trimegestone alone at dosages of 0.25 to 0.5 mg/day include breast tenderness (40.7–43.0%), abdominal pain (13.9–16.7%), headache (16.0–19.4%), nervousness (12.7–16.0%), bloating (10.3–16.0%), muscle cramps (12.3–13.9%), nausea (4.8–12.3%), and depression (3.0–3.1%). The most common side effects of the combination of 1 mg/day estradiol and 0.125–0.25 mg/day trimegestone include headache (26.4%), breast pain (15–20%), abdominal pain (18%), and vaginal bleeding (9–18%), and metrorrhagia (18.8%).

== Pharmacology ==
=== Pharmacodynamics ===
Trimegestone is a progestogen, or an agonist of the progesterone receptor (PR). It has very high affinity for the PR, about 588 to 660% of that of progesterone. This is greater than that of almost all other widely used progestins, with the exception of the 19-nortestosterone derivative gestodene (which has about 864% of the affinity of progesterone). In accordance with its very high affinity for the PR, trimegestone is described as a very potent progestogen, showing secretory transformation of the estrogen-treated endometrium at a dosage of only 0.1 mg/day, and is the most potent progestin of the 19-norprogesterone group. Like other progestogens, trimegestone has functional antiestrogenic effects in certain tissues such as the endometrium and has antigonadotropic effects. The endometrial transformation dosage of trimegestone is 0.25 to 0.5 mg/day and its ovulation-inhibiting dosage is 0.5 mg/day.

In addition to its affinity for the PR, trimegestone has moderate affinity for the mineralocorticoid receptor (42–120% of that of aldosterone), weak to very weak affinity for the glucocorticoid and androgen receptors (9–13% of that of dexamethasone and 1–2.4% of that of testosterone, respectively), and no affinity for the estrogen receptor (less than 0.02% of that of estradiol). In accordance, it possesses weak antimineralocorticoid activity, very weak antiandrogenic activity, and no androgenic, estrogenic, glucocorticoid, antiglucocorticoid, or mineralocorticoid activity. As such, it is a selective and mostly pure progestogen. Unlike progesterone, trimegestone does not metabolize into neurosteroids and hence does not influence GABA_{A} receptor signaling or produce sedative side effects.

The antiandrogenic potency of trimegestone in animals is about 30% of that of cyproterone acetate.

=== Pharmacokinetics ===
The oral bioavailability of trimegestone is about 100%. Following a single oral dose of trimegestone, peak serum concentrations occur within 0.5 hours and are 12–15 ng/mL (35–44 nmol/L) for a 0.5 mg dose and 25 ng/mL (73 nmol/L) for a 1 mg dose. Circulating levels of trimegestone increase proportionally across dosages of 0.25 to 1 mg/day. Steady-state levels of trimegestone are achieved within 3 days of daily administration. The plasma protein binding of trimegestone is 98%; it is bound to albumin. Trimegestone is metabolized mainly via hydroxylation. The 1β- and 6β-hydroxy metabolites of trimegestone are progestogens with considerable potency similarly and show little or no affinity to other steroid hormone receptors. The elimination half-life of trimegestone is between 12 and 20 hours, with an average of about 13.8 to 15.6 hours.

== Chemistry ==
Trimegestone, also known as 21(S)-hydroxy-17α,21-dimethyl-δ^{9}-19-norprogesterone or as 21(S)-hydroxy-17α,21-dimethyl-19-norpregna-4,9-dien-3,20-dione, is a synthetic norpregnane steroid and a derivative of progesterone. It is specifically a combined derivative of 17α-methylprogesterone and 19-norprogesterone, or of 17α-methyl-19-norprogesterone. Related derivatives of 17α-methyl-19-norprogesterone include demegestone and promegestone.

== History ==
Trimegestone was first described in 1979 and was introduced for medical use in 2001. It was discovered as an active metabolite of promegestone. The medication originated by Sanofi-Aventis in France, where promegestone was developed, and was first marketed by Wyeth in Sweden.

== Society and culture ==
=== Generic names ===
Trimegestone is the generic name of the drug and its INN, USAN, and BAN, while trimégestone is its DCF. It is also known by its developmental code name RU-27987.

=== Brand names ===
Trimegestone under the brand names Ginotex, Lovelle, Lovelle Ciclico, Lovelle Continuo, Minique, Ondeva, Totelle, Totelle Ciclico, Totelle Ciclo, Totelle Continuo, Totelle Cycle, Totelle Cyclo, Totelle Secuencial, and Totelle Sekvens. With the exception of Ondeva, which is formulated alone, all of these products are formulated in combination with estradiol.

=== Availability ===
Trimegestone is or has been marketed in Europe and Latin America, including in Argentina, Austria, Belgium, Brazil, Chile, Denmark, Finland, France, Italy, Lithuania, Mexico, Norway, Sweden, and Venezuela. It is not available in any predominantly English-speaking countries, including the United States, Canada, the United Kingdom, Ireland, Australia, New Zealand, or South Africa.

== Research ==
The oral combination of trimegestone and ethinylestradiol was under development by Wyeth in the United States as a birth control pill to prevent pregnancy and the oral combination of trimegestone and conjugated estrogens was under development by Wyeth in the United States to treat menopausal syndrome and to prevent postmenopausal osteoporosis, but the development of both formulations was discontinued and they were never marketed. A transdermal patch with the developmental code name PSK-3987 containing estradiol and trimegestone was under development by ProStrakan for the treatment of menopausal syndrome, but it too never completed development and hence was not marketed.
