= Drospirenone/estetrol =

Pharmaceutical combination

Combination of
- Drospirenone: Progestogen
- Estetrol (medication): Estrogen

Clinical data
- Trade names: Nextstellis, Drovelis, Lydisilka, others
- Other names: E4/DRSP; FSN-013
- AHFS/Drugs.com: Monograph
- License data: US DailyMed: Drospirenone_and_estetrol
- Pregnancy category: AU: B3
- Routes of administration: By mouth
- ATC code: G03AA18 (WHO)

Legal status
- Legal status: AU: S4 (Prescription only); CA: ℞-only; US: ℞-only; EU: Rx-only

Identifiers
- ChemSpider: None
- KEGG: D12047

Drospirenone/estetrol, sold under the brand name Nextstellis, among others, is a fixed-dose combination medication containing drospirenone, a progestin, and estetrol, an estrogen, which is used as a combined birth control pill for the prevention of pregnancy in women. It is taken by mouth.

It was approved for medical use in Canada in March 2021, and in the United States in April 2021.

== Medical uses ==
Drospirenone/estetrol is used as a combined birth control pill to prevent pregnancy in women.

== Side effects ==
Estetrol-containing birth control pills, similarly to estradiol-containing birth control pills, may have a lower risk of venous thromboembolism (VTE) than ethinylestradiol-containing birth control pills based on studies of coagulation. However, it is likely that another decade will be required before post-marketing epidemiological studies of VTE incidence with these birth control pills are completed and able to confirm this.

== Pharmacology ==
=== Pharmacodynamics ===
Drospirenone/estetrol has a much lower impact on liver protein synthesis, including of sex hormone-binding globulin, angiotensinogen, and coagulation factors, than does ethinylestradiol/drospirenone.

== Society and culture ==
=== Legal status ===
Drospirenone/estetrol is approved for the use of hormonal contraception in the European Union, the United States, and Canada.

=== Brand names ===
Drospirenone/estetrol in sold under the brand names Nextstellis, Drovelis, and Lydisilka.

== See also ==
- Birth control pill formulations
- List of combined sex-hormonal preparations § Estrogens and progestogens
