= 17α-Bromoprogesterone =

Chemical compound

Clinical data
- Other names: 17α-BP; 17α-Bromopregn-4-ene-3,20-dione
- Drug class: Progestogen; Progestin

Identifiers
- IUPAC name: (8R,9S,10R,13S,14S,17R)-17-Acetyl-17-bromo-10,13-dimethyl-2,6,7,8,9,11,12,14,15,16-decahydro-1H-cyclopenta[a]phenanthren-3-one
- CAS Number: 28449-24-3
- PubChem CID: 68524848
- ChemSpider: 103882972
- UNII: YBT8Y54Z9P

Chemical and physical data
- Formula: C_{21}H_{29}BrO_{2}
- Molar mass: 393.365 g·mol^{−1}
- 3D model (JSmol): Interactive image
- SMILES: CC(=O)[C@]1(CC[C@@H]2[C@@]1(CC[C@H]3[C@H]2CCC4=CC(=O)CC[C@]34C)C)Br
- InChI: InChI=1S/C21H29BrO2/c1-13(23)21(22)11-8-18-16-5-4-14-12-15(24)6-9-19(14,2)17(16)7-10-20(18,21)3/h12,16-18H,4-11H2,1-3H3/t16-,17+,18+,19+,20+,21+/m1/s1; Key:IENASMFTJRLBJP-CEGNMAFCSA-N

17α-Bromoprogesterone (17α-BP) is a progestin which was first described in 1957 and was never marketed. It is about twice as potent as progesterone in terms of progestogenic activity in animal bioassays. 17α-BP is a parent compound of haloprogesterone (6α-fluoro-17α-bromoprogesterone) and 6α-methyl-17α-bromoprogesterone.

== See also ==
- 17α-Hydroxyprogesterone
- 17α-Methylprogesterone
- 19-Norprogesterone
