= Ethinylestradiol/drospirenone/prasterone =

Combination drug

Ethinylestradiol / drospirenone / prasterone
Combination of
- Ethinylestradiol: Estrogen
- Drospirenone: Progestogen; Progestin; Antimineralocorticoid; Antiandrogen
- Prasterone: Androgen; Anabolic steroid; Androgen prohormone; Neurosteroid

Clinical data
- Other names: EE/DRSP/DHEA; Androgen Restored Contraceptive; ARC; Female Balance Pill; Pill-Plus; Triple Oral Contraceptive; Triple OC
- Routes of administration: By mouth
- Drug class: Estrogen; Progestin; Progestogen; Antimineralocorticoid; Androgen; Anabolic steroid

Legal status
- Legal status: US: ℞-only

Ethinylestradiol/drospirenone/prasterone (EE/DRSP/DHEA), known under developmental code names like Androgen Restored Contraceptive (ARC), Female Balance Pill, Pill-Plus, and Triple Oral Contraceptive (Triple OC), is a combination of ethinylestradiol (EE), an estrogen, drospirenone (DRSP), a progestin, antimineralocorticoid, and antiandrogen, and prasterone (dehydroepiandrosterone; DHEA), an androgen prohormone and neurosteroid, which is under development for use as a birth control pill to prevent pregnancy in women. Clinical studies of this formulation have been conducted and published. Estrogens and progestogens suppress testosterone levels in women, and the addition of 50 mg prasterone, an oral prohormone of testosterone, has been found to restore total testosterone levels to normal levels. However, free testosterone levels, although higher with the addition of prasterone, remain significantly lower than usual despite prasterone inclusion.

== See also ==
- List of combined sex-hormonal preparations § Estrogens, progestogens, and androgens
