= Premenstrual syndrome =

Emotional and physical symptoms that occur one to two weeks before a menstrual period

- Specialty: Gynecology, psychiatry
- Symptoms: Fatigue, irritability and other mood changes, tender breasts, abdominal bloating
- Complications: Premenstrual dysphoric disorder
- Usual onset: 1–2 weeks before menstruation
- Duration: 6 days
- Causes: Unknown
- Risk factors: High-salt diet, alcohol, caffeine
- Diagnostic method: Based on symptoms
- Treatment: Lifestyle changes, medication
- Medication: Calcium and vitamin D supplementation, NSAIDs, birth control pills
- Frequency: ~25% of women

Premenstrual syndrome (PMS) is a disruptive set of emotional and physical symptoms that regularly occur in the one to two weeks before the start of each menstrual period. Symptoms resolve around the time menstrual bleeding begins. Symptoms vary, though commonly include one or more physical, emotional, or behavioral symptoms, that resolve with menses. The range of symptoms is wide, and most commonly are breast tenderness, bloating, headache, mood swings, depression, anxiety, anger, and irritability. To be diagnosed as PMS, rather than a normal discomfort of the menstrual cycle, these symptoms must interfere with daily living, during two menstrual cycles of prospective recording. PMS-related symptoms are often present for about six days. An individual's pattern of symptoms may change over time. PMS does not produce symptoms during pregnancy or following menopause.

Diagnosis requires a consistent pattern of emotional and physical symptoms occurring after ovulation and before menstruation (known as the luteal phase) to a degree that interferes with normal life. Emotional symptoms must not be present during the initial part of the menstrual cycle. A daily list of symptoms over a few months may help in diagnosis. Other disorders that cause similar symptoms need to be excluded before a diagnosis is made.

The cause of PMS is unknown, but the underlying mechanism is believed to involve changes in hormone levels during the course of the whole menstrual cycle. Reducing salt, alcohol, caffeine, and stress, along with increasing exercise is typically all that is recommended for the management of mild symptoms. Calcium and vitamin D supplementation may be useful in some. Anti-inflammatory drugs such as ibuprofen or naproxen may help with physical symptoms. In those with more significant symptoms, birth control pills or the diuretic spironolactone may be useful.

Over 90% of women report having some premenstrual symptoms, such as bloating, headaches, and moodiness. Premenstrual symptoms generally do not cause substantial disruption, and only qualify as PMS in approximately 20% of pre-menopausal women. Antidepressants of the selective serotonin reuptake inhibitors (SSRI) class may be used to treat the emotional symptoms of PMS.

Premenstrual dysphoric disorder (PMDD) is a more severe condition that has greater psychological symptoms. PMDD affects about 3% of women of child-bearing age.

== Signs and symptoms ==
Any disruptive, cyclical symptom could be a symptom of PMS, and some sources have suggested that the number of claimed symptoms could exceed even 200. However, some symptoms are relatively common in PMS. Common emotional and non-specific symptoms include stress, anxiety, difficulty with sleep, headache, feeling tired, mood swings, increased emotional sensitivity, and changes in interest in sex. Problems with concentration and memory may occur. There may also be depression or anxiety.

Common physical symptoms include bloating, bilateral breast tenderness, and headache.

The exact symptoms and their intensity vary significantly from person to person, and even somewhat from cycle to cycle and over time. Most people with premenstrual syndrome experience only a few of the possible symptoms, in a relatively predictable pattern. Additionally, which symptoms are accepted as evidence of PMS varies by culture. For example, women in China report feeling cold but do not report negative affect as part of PMS, while women in the US report negative affect but not feeling cold as part of PMS.

The exclusion of certain symptoms associated with the menstrual cycle can pose a challenge for researchers. For example, period pain, which is common, is excluded, as it does not usually appear until menstruation, but some experience period pain prior. However, any kind of pain can contribute to stress, difficulty with sleep, fatigue, irritability, and other symptoms that do count towards a PMS diagnosis.

== Causes ==
While PMS is linked to the luteal phase, the causes of PMS are not clear, but several factors may be involved. Changes in hormones during the menstrual cycle seem to be an important factor, with changing hormone levels affecting some more than others. PMS occurs more often in those who are in their late 20s and early 40s, have at least one child, have a family history of depression, and have a past medical history of either postpartum depression or a mood disorder.

== Diagnosis ==
No laboratory tests or unique physical findings exist to verify a PMS diagnosis. However, the three key features are noted:

- The chief complaint is one or more of the emotional symptoms associated with PMS. Irritability, tension, or unhappiness are typical emotional symptoms.
- Symptoms appear predictably during the luteal phase, reduce or disappear predictably shortly before or during menstruation, and remain absent during the follicular (pre-ovulatory) phase.
- The symptoms must be severe enough to cause distress or interfere with everyday life. Mild or occasional symptoms, which are extremely common, do not necessarily qualify as PMS.

The National Institute of Mental Health research definition compares the intensity of symptoms from cycle days 5 to 10 to the six-day interval before the onset of the menstrual period. To qualify as PMS, symptom intensity must increase at least 30% in the six days before menstruation. Additionally, this pattern must be documented for at least two consecutive cycles. In 2016, the Royal College of Obstetricians and Gynaecologists argued that the definition of PMS should be changed to no longer require the presence of a psychological symptom.

To document a pattern, potentially affected individuals may keep a prospective record of their symptoms on a calendar for at least two menstrual cycles. This will help to establish if the symptoms are limited to the premenstrual time, predictably recurring, and disruptive to normal functioning. A number of standardized instruments have been developed to describe PMS, including the Calendar of Premenstrual syndrome Experiences (COPE), the Prospective Record of the Impact and Severity of Menstruation (PRISM), and the Visual Analogue Scales (VAS).

Additionally, other conditions that may better explain symptoms must be excluded, as a number of pre-existing medical conditions may be made worse at menstruation. This is known as menstrual exacerbation or premenstrual magnification. These conditions may lead individuals who do not have PMS to incorrectly believe they have PMS when they have another underlying disorder, such as anemia, hypothyroidism, eating disorders and substance abuse. A key feature is that these conditions may also be present outside of the luteal phase. Conditions that can be magnified perimenstrually include depression or other affective disorders, migraine, seizure disorders, fatigue, irritable bowel syndrome, asthma, and allergies.

Further, problems with other aspects of the female reproductive system must be excluded, including dysmenorrhea (period pain during menstruation, rather than before it), endometriosis, perimenopause, and adverse effects produced by oral contraceptive pills.

Severe symptoms may qualify as PMDD, a condition which differs in the magnitude of its affects.

== Management ==
Many treatments have been tried in PMS. Typical recommendations for those with mild symptoms include:

- reducing salt and caffeine intake,
- not drinking alcohol,
- reducing stress, e.g., by scheduling fewer activities during the week before menstruation,
- learning what to expect with PMS,
- increasing exercise, and
- improving sleep.

When self-care is not adequate, then medical management may be appropriate.

=== Management of physical symptoms ===
Anti-inflammatory drugs such as naproxen may help with some physical symptoms, such as pain.

Spironolactone is effective as a diuretic when water retention cannot be addressed through self-care alone; however, thiazide diuretics are ineffective.

==== Hormonal medications ====
In those with more significant symptoms birth control pills may be useful. Hormonal contraception is commonly used; common forms include the combined oral contraceptive pill and the contraceptive patch. This class of medication may cause PMS-related symptoms in some and may reduce physical symptoms in others. They do not relieve emotional symptoms.

Gonadotropin-releasing hormone agonists can be useful in severe forms of PMS but have their own set of significant potential side effects, such as bone loss.

Progesterone support was used for many years – in the 1950s, a deficiency of progesterone was believed to be the cause of PMS – but it does not provide any benefit.

=== Management of emotional symptoms ===
==== Antidepressants ====
Antidepressants, particularly SSRIs and venlafaxine, are used as the first-line treatment of severe emotional symptoms of PMS, and also in treating PMDD. Those with PMS may be able to take medication only on the days when symptoms are expected to occur, because relief often appears within a few days, rather than the longer timespan expected for depression or other common psychiatric conditions. Additionally, the minimum dose is often lower than for treatment of depression. Although intermittent therapy might be effective and acceptable to some, it might be less effective than continuous regimens for others, especially if they are also experiencing symptoms unrelated to the menstrual cycle. Side effects such as nausea and weakness are however relatively common.

=== Vitamins, minerals, and alternative medicine ===
Calcium, magnesium, vitamin E, vitamin B6, chasteberry, and black cohosh may help some. St. John's wort is discouraged because it causes many drug–drug interactions. Although St John's wort may help some with PMS, it is ineffective for PMDD. Evening primrose oil does not help.

== Prognosis ==
PMS is generally a stable diagnosis, with susceptible individuals experiencing the same symptoms at the same intensity near the end of each cycle for years. Treatment for specific symptoms is usually effective. Unsuccessful medical management of severe symptoms frequently indicates misdiagnosis.

Perimenstrual breast pain is associated with fibrocystic breast changes.

Even without treatment, symptoms tend to decrease in perimenopausal women, and induction of menopause through surgical removal of the ovaries is a treatment of last resort. However, those who experience PMS or PMDD are more likely to have significant symptoms associated with menopause, such as hot flashes.

== Epidemiology ==
Over 90% of women report having some premenstrual symptoms, such as bloating, headaches, and moodiness. Mostly the symptoms are mild.

Globally, about 20% of women of reproductive age have PMS that disrupts their everyday lives. Additionally, about 30% of women have mild or moderate symptoms related to their menstrual cycles that do not disrupt their everyday lives.

== History ==
PMS was originally seen as an imagined disease. Women who reported its symptoms were often told it was "all in their head". Woman's reproductive organs were thought to control them. Women were warned not to divert needed energy away from the uterus and ovaries. This view of limited energy very quickly ran up against a reality in 19th-century America that young girls worked extremely long and hard hours in factories; newspapers in the 19th century were peppered with remedies to help in the "tyrannous processes" of the menstrual cycle. In 1873 Edward Clarke published an influential book titled Sex in Education. Clarke came to the conclusion that female operatives suffer less than schoolgirls because they "work their brain less". This suggested that they have stronger bodies and a reproductive "apparatus more normally constructed". Feminists later took opposition to Clarke's argument that women should not leave the private sphere by showing that women could function in the world outside the home in spite of natural body functions.

The first formal description of what is now called PMS as a medical problem, rather than a normal and natural variation, goes back to 1931, in a paper presented at the New York Academy of Medicine by Robert T. Frank titled "Hormonal Causes of Premenstrual Tension". He incorrectly attributed premenstrual symptoms to an excess of the newly discovered sex hormone, estrogen.

The specific name premenstrual syndrome first appeared in the medical literature in 1953. At that time, medical researchers incorrectly thought that PMS was caused by a deficiency in progesterone.

Since at least the 1990s, when PMDD became accepted, the definitions of PMS have focused on psychological symptoms. Throughout the history of PMS, many of the symptoms associated with it have been stereotypical feminine behaviors, such as expressing emotions or "nagging".

Since then, PMS has been a continuous presence in popular culture, occupying a place that is larger than the research attention accorded it as a medical diagnosis. Some have argued that women are partially responsible for the medicalization of PMS. They claim that women are partially responsible for legitimizing this disorder and have thus contributed to the social construction of PMS as an illness. The public debate over PMS and PMDD may have been affected by organizations who had a stake in the outcome including feminists, the American Psychiatric Association, physicians and scientists.

== Alternative views ==
Some supporters of PMS as a social construct believe PMDD and PMS to be unrelated issues: according to them, PMDD is a product of brain chemistry, and PMS is a product of culture, i.e. a culture-bound syndrome. Women are socially conditioned to expect PMS, or to at least know of its existence, and they therefore report their symptoms accordingly. Becoming educated about PMS narrows their interpretation of their experiences by teaching them that certain symptoms are accepted as part of PMS, and that other symptoms are not, even though an accepted symptom might be unrelated to PMS for that woman (who might have a different medical condition), and an excluded symptom might be part of PMS, but not mentioned because they did not think it was relevant. Social psychologist Carol Tavris also says that PMS is blamed as an explanation for rage or sadness.

The identification of PMS as a medical disorder has been criticized as inappropriate medicalization. These critics are concerned that society is pathologizing the menstrual cycle itself, even when the signs and symptoms are non-disruptive.

The view of PMS as primarily a psychological situation, rather than primarily a biologically driven, medical condition dominated by physical symptoms, has also been criticized. This view makes it harder to address psychosocial factors, such as external stress and a lack of social support, that exacerbate premenstrual symptoms. Treating PMS as a psychological situation also makes it difficult to address menstrual exacerbation of other conditions, including catamenial epilepsy, menstrual migraine, and cyclical asthma.

The limitation of PMS to premenstrual symptoms, rather than having a diagnosis that covers all symptoms associated with the menstrual cycle, has also been criticized. Critics of this limitation think that excluding common physical symptoms that appear during the menstrual phase, such as period pain, fatigue, and back pain, is an arbitrary distinction that tends to reinforce the view of PMS as primarily an emotional problem, rather than a biological one. They propose a focus on perimenstrual symptoms instead of strictly pre-menstrual ones.

== Research directions ==
Open research questions related to treatment include how to predict who will respond to SSRIs, which non-drug treatments are effective, and how to manage people who have PMS in addition to other medical conditions.

Researchers are also working towards a single, uniform set of diagnostic criteria and to identify any objective characteristics that could be useful for diagnosis, such as any possible genetic predisposition.

== See also ==
- List of investigational PMS/PMDD drugs
- Menstrual leave
