= Luteal phase =

Latter part of the menstrual cycle

Menstrual cycle

The luteal phase is the last phase of the menstrual cycle. The menstrual cycle is on average 28 days in length, beginning with menses (day 1–7) during the follicular phase (day 1–14), followed by ovulation (day 14) and ending with the luteal phase (day 14–28). The luteal phase was thought to be relatively fixed at approximately 14 days, but studies now suggest that there can be wide variability in luteal phase lengths not just from person to person, but from cycle to cycle within one person. The luteal phase is characterized by changes to hormone levels, such as an increase in progesterone and estrogen levels, decrease in gonadotropins such as follicle-stimulating hormone (FSH) and luteinizing hormone (LH), changes to the endometrial lining to promote implantation of the fertilized egg, and development of the corpus luteum. In the absence of fertilization by sperm, the corpus luteum degenerates leading to a decrease in progesterone and estrogen, an increase in FSH and LH, and shedding of the endometrial lining (menses) to begin the menstrual cycle again.

== Hormones ==
After ovulation and release of the secondary oocyte, the anterior pituitary hormones – follicle-stimulating hormone (FSH) and luteinizing hormone (LH) are released and cause the remaining parts of the ruptured follicle to transform into the corpus luteum. The corpus luteum continues to grow during the luteal phase after ovulation and produces significant amounts of hormones, particularly progesterone, and, to a lesser extent, estrogen and inhibin. Progesterone plays a vital role in making the endometrium receptive to implantation of the embryo and supportive of early pregnancy. High levels of progesterone inhibit the growth of the other follicles.

The increase in estrogen and progesterone also lead to increased basal body temperature during the luteal phase.

The LH surge that occurs during ovulation triggers the release of the oocyte and its cumulus oophorus from the ovary and into the fallopian tube, and triggers the oocyte to divide and enter metaphase of meiosis II (46 or 2n chromosome) and extrude its first polar body. The oocyte will only continue through meiosis and extrude its second polar body once it is fertilized. Ovulation occurs ~35 hours after the beginning of the LH surge or ~10 hours following the LH surge. Several days after ovulation, the increasing amount of estrogen produced by the corpus luteum may cause one or two days of fertile cervical mucus, lower basal body temperatures, or both. This is known as a "secondary estrogen surge".

The hormones released by the corpus luteum suppress production of the FSH and LH from the anterior pituitary gland. The corpus luteum relies on LH activation on its receptors in order to survive. The loss of the corpus luteum can be prevented by implantation of an embryo: after implantation, human embryos produce human chorionic gonadotropin (hCG), which is structurally similar to LH and can preserve the corpus luteum. If implantation occurs, the corpus luteum will continue to produce progesterone for eight to twelve weeks, after which the placenta takes over this function. In the absence of fertilization, hCG is not produced and the corpus luteum will atrophy in 10–12 days (Luteolysis or luteal regression). The death of the corpus luteum results in falling levels of progesterone and estrogen. The drop in ovarian hormones releases negative feedback on LH and FSH, thereby increasing LH and FSH concentrations and leading to shedding of the endometrium and another round of ovarian follicle selection.

== Uterine cycle phases ==
During the follicular phase in the menstrual cycle, the uterine endometrium is in the proliferative phase which is characterized by an increase in circulating estrogen produced by the developing follicle. Increased estradiol alters the endometrial lining and promotes proliferation of epithelial cells, thickening of the tissue, and elongation of the spiral arteries that provide nutrients to the growing tissue. Estrogen also makes the endometrium more sensitive to progesterone in preparation for the luteal phase.

After ovulation and during the luteal phase, the uterine endometrium is in the secretory phase which is characterized by the production of progesterone from the growing corpus luteum. Progesterone inhibits endometrial proliferation, and preserves uterine tissue in preparation for fertilized egg implantation. At the end of the luteal phase, progesterone levels fall and the corpus luteum atrophies. The drop in progesterone leads to endometrial ischemia which will subsequently shed in the beginning of the next cycle at the start of menses. This last stage in the luteal or secretory phase may be called the ischemic phase and lasts just for one or two days.

== Symptoms ==
Changes in the level of progesterone during this phase may cause typical premenstrual symptoms, such as bloating, headaches, and moodiness. A range of other symptoms may reflect premenstrual syndrome.
