= Pharmacodynamics of spironolactone =

Mechanisms of action

7α-Thiomethylspironolactone, the major active form of spironolactone. It accounts for about 80% of the potassium-sparing effect of spironolactone.

Canrenone, the second major active form of spironolactone. It accounts for around 10 to 25% of the potassium-sparing effect of spironolactone.

Spironolactone at steroid hormone receptors
Site	Value (nM)	Type	Action	Species	Ref
AR	39.4; 120; 13–670 >20,000	K_{i} IC_{50}^{a} IC_{50}^{b} EC_{50}	Antagonist	Human	
ER^{c}	>1,100; 5,700	K_{i} IC_{50}^{b}	Antagonist	Human	
ERα	5,970–>20,000 >20,000	IC_{50}^{b} EC_{50}	Agonist	Human	
ERβ	4940–>20,000; 3,300	IC_{50}^{b} EC_{50}	Inconsistent	Human	
GR	32.6; 1,400; 2,410–6,920 >20,000	K_{i} IC_{50}^{a} IC_{50}^{b} EC_{50}	Antagonist	Human	
MR	2.32; 49; 2.4–60; 17.7	K_{i} IC_{50}^{a} IC_{50}^{b} K_{b}	Antagonist	Human	
PR^{c}	400; 650 >25,000; 740–2,619	K_{i} IC_{50}^{a} IC_{50}^{b} EC_{50}	Agonist	Human	
PR-B	4,000 >20,000	IC_{50}^{b} EC_{50}	Antagonist	Human	
Notes: The ranges are the values reported in different studies. Footnotes: ^{a} = Binding inhibition. ^{b} = Functional antagonism. ^{c} = Subtype unspecified (probably ERα and PR-B, however). Sources:

The pharmacodynamics of spironolactone, an antimineralocorticoid and antiandrogen medication, concern its mechanisms of action, including its biological targets and activities, as well as its physiological effects. The pharmacodynamics of spironolactone are characterized by high antimineralocorticoid activity, moderate antiandrogenic activity, and weak steroidogenesis inhibition. In addition, spironolactone has sometimes been found to increase estradiol and cortisol levels and hence could have slight indirect estrogenic and glucocorticoid effects. The medication has also been found to interact very weakly with the estrogen and progesterone receptors, and to act as an agonist of the pregnane X receptor. Likely due to increased activation of the estrogen and/or progesterone receptors, spironolactone has very weak but significant antigonadotropic effects.

Spironolactone has a very short biological half-life and is considered to be a prodrug; hence, its active metabolites are responsible for most of its pharmacodynamics. The major active forms of spironolactone include 7α-thiomethylspironolactone (7α-TMS) and canrenone (7α-desthioacetyl-δ^{6}-spironolactone), while minor metabolites of spironolactone include 7α-thiospironolactone (7α-TS), 6β-hydroxy-7α-thiomethylspironolactone (6β-OH-7α-TMS), and a number of others.

Aside from its primary mechanisms of action of antimineralocorticoid and antiandrogenic action, spironolactone has been found in preclinical research to interact very weakly with the progesterone and estrogen receptors and to have very weak mixed progestogenic and antiprogestogenic activity as well as very weak mixed estrogenic and antiestrogenic activity. The clinical significance of these actions, if any, is uncertain. However, a small clinical study found that high doses of spironolactone had neither progestogenic nor antiprogestogenic effects in women. In any case, if one or both of these actions are clinically relevant, they might contribute to the menstrual irregularities and breast side effects of spironolactone. Spironolactone is also an agonist of the pregnane X receptor, and is able to induce the expression of CYP3A4 and P-glycoprotein in the body via this action. This effect may contribute to the drug interactions of spironolactone.

== Antimineralocorticoid activity ==
Spironolactone inhibits the effects of mineralocorticoids, namely, aldosterone, by displacing them from the mineralocorticoid receptor (MR) in the cortical collecting duct of kidney nephrons. This decreases the reabsorption of sodium and water while limiting the excretion of potassium. Hence, aldosterone antagonists are potassium (K^{+}) sparing diuretics. The medication has a slightly delayed onset of action, and so it takes several days for diuresis to occur since the MR is a nuclear receptor which works through regulating gene transcription and gene expression. Therefore, the production and expression of ENaC and ROMK electrolyte channels in the distal nephrons, which give the drug its diuretic properties, has a delayed onset of action. In addition to direct antagonism of the MRs, the antimineralocorticoid effects of spironolactone may also in part be mediated by direct inactivation of 11β-hydroxylase and aldosterone synthase (18-hydroxylase), enzymes involved in the biosynthesis of mineralocorticoids. If levels of mineralocorticoids are decreased, then there are lower circulating levels to compete with spironolactone to influence gene expression as mentioned above. The onset of action of the antimineralocorticoid effects of spironolactone is relatively slow, with the peak effect sometimes occurring 48 hours or more after the first dose.

Canrenone is an antagonist of the MR as is spironolactone, but it is slightly more potent in comparison. It has been determined that 7α-TMS accounts for around 80% of the potassium-sparing effect of spironolactone while canrenone accounts for the remaining approximately 10 to 25%. Accordingly, 7α-TMS occurs at higher circulating concentrations than does canrenone in addition to having a higher relative affinity for the MR.

== Antiandrogenic activity ==
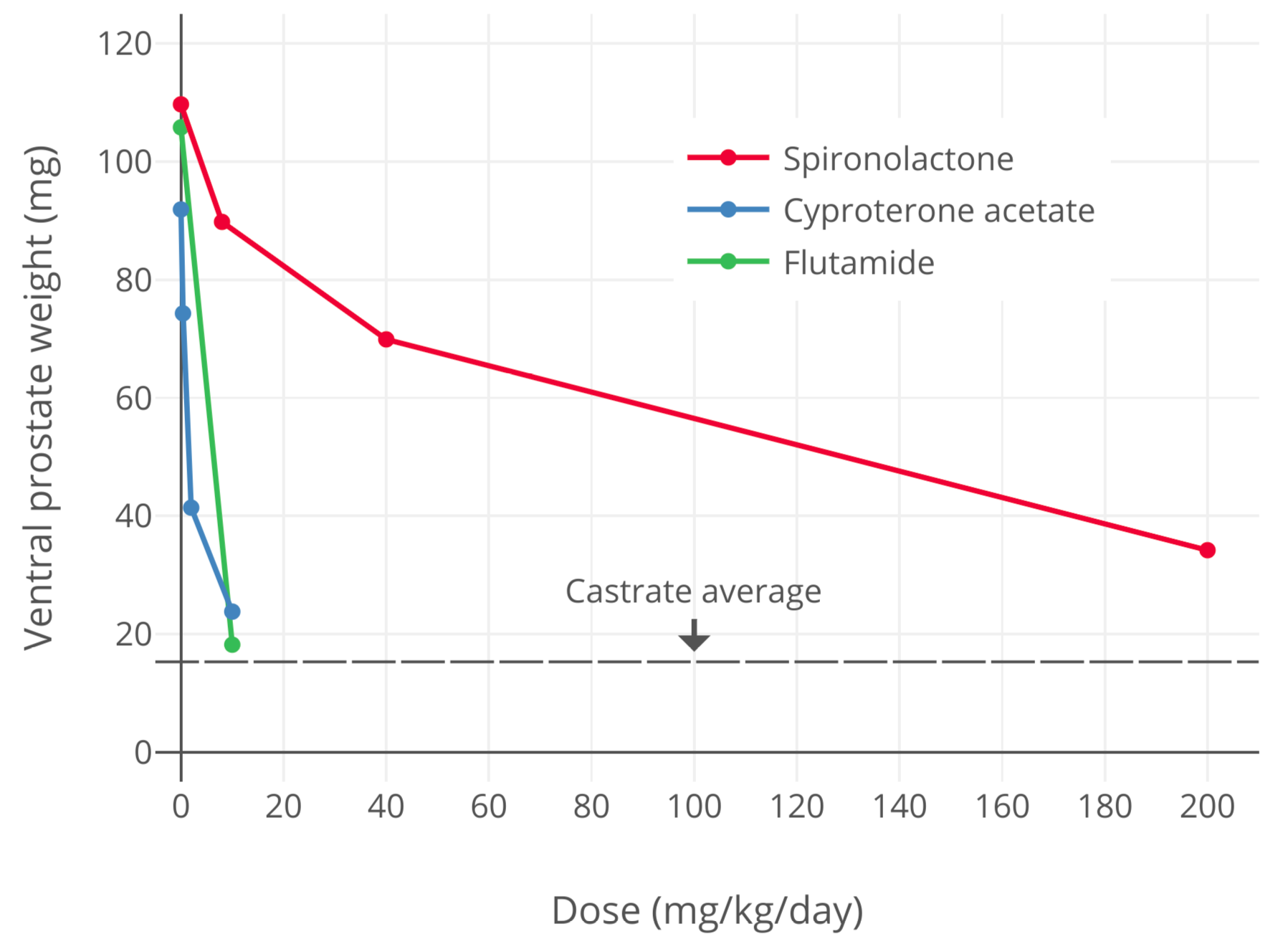
Androgen receptor antagonistic potency of spironolactone, cyproterone acetate, and flutamide in castrated male rats treated with exogenous testosterone (as measured by inhibition of androgen-dependent ventral prostate weight).

Spironolactone is an antagonist of the AR, the biological target of androgens like testosterone and DHT. Its affinity for the AR has been found to vary widely depending on the report consulted, with a range of 2.7 to 67% that of DHT. One study found AR affinities of 3.0% for spironolactone, 4.2% for 7α-TMS, and 3.1% for 7α-TS. In contrast, the affinity of canrenone for the AR was found to be 0.84% that of DHT in another study, relative to 67% for spironolactone. However, another study found the affinity of canrenone for the AR to be 2.5 to 14%, relative to 4.1 to 31% in the case of spironolactone. Another study that directly compared the affinities of spironolactone and canrenone reported that spironolactone had 5-fold higher affinity for the AR than canrenone (5% and 1% of that of DHT, respectively). A comparative study of binding inhibition to the AR in rat prostate cytosol AR found IC_{50} values of 3 nM for DHT, 24 nM for cyproterone acetate, and 67 nM for spironolactone.

Spironolactone antagonizes the effects of exogenous testosterone administered to castrated animals. It works by binding to the AR and displacing androgens like testosterone and DHT from the receptor, thereby reducing its activation by these hormones. A study found that oral spironolactone had "about 10 to 20% of the feminizing effect of cyproterone acetate" on sexual differentiation in male rat fetuses, with a dose of 40 mg/day spironolactone having an effect equal to 1–3 mg/day cyproterone acetate.

The AR antagonism of spironolactone mostly underlies its antiandrogenic activity and is the major mechanism responsible for its therapeutic benefits in the treatment of androgen-dependent conditions like acne, hirsutism, and pattern hair loss and its usefulness in hormone therapy for transgender women. In addition, the AR antagonism of spironolactone is involved in its feminizing side effects, such as gynecomastia in men. Spironolactone has been found to produce gynecomastia without changes in testosterone or estradiol levels, implicating AR antagonism in this side effect. Gynecomastia is a major known side effect of AR antagonists.

Spironolactone, similarly to other steroidal antiandrogens such as cyproterone acetate, is actually not a pure, or silent, antagonist of the AR, but rather is a weak partial agonist with the capacity for both antagonistic and agonistic effects. However, in the presence of sufficiently high levels of potent full agonists like testosterone and DHT (the cases in which spironolactone is usually used even with regards to the "lower" relative levels present in females), spironolactone will behave more similarly to a pure antagonist. Nonetheless, there may still be a potential for spironolactone to produce androgenic effects in the body at sufficiently high dosages and/or in those with very low endogenous androgen concentrations. As an example, one condition in which spironolactone is contraindicated is prostate cancer in men being treated with androgen deprivation therapy, as spironolactone has been shown in vitro to significantly accelerate carcinoma growth in the absence of any other androgens. Three case reports have described significant worsening of prostate cancer with spironolactone treatment in patients with the disease, leading the authors to conclude that spironolactone has the potential for androgenic effects in some contexts and that it should perhaps be considered to be a selective androgen receptor modulator (SARM), albeit with mostly antagonistic effects. However, in another case report, spironolactone was effective in normalizing prostate-specific antigen in a man with prostate cancer. In addition, spironolactone has been studied in the treatment of prostate cancer.

Canrenone binds to and blocks the AR in vitro. However, relative to spironolactone, canrenone is described as having very weak affinity for the AR. In accordance, replacement of spironolactone with canrenone in male patients has been found to reverse spironolactone-induced gynecomastia, suggesting that canrenone is comparatively much less potent in vivo as an antiandrogen. The antiandrogenic effects of spironolactone are considered in large part to result from other metabolites rather than canrenone. In accordance, 7α-TS and 7α-TMS have been found to possess approximately equivalent affinity for the rat prostate AR relative to that of spironolactone, thus likely accounting for the retention of the antiandrogenic activity of spironolactone.

Spironolactone is described as having relatively weak antiandrogenic activity. Nonetheless, it is useful as an antiandrogen in women, who have low androgen levels compared to men. In addition, instances of gynecomastia, decreased libido, and erectile dysfunction have been reported in men taking very high doses of spironolactone (200 to 400 mg/day).

Affinities of selected ligands at the androgen receptor
Compound	AR RBA (%)	AR K_{i} (nM)
Metribolone	100	1.18
Dihydrotestosterone	136	0.87
Testosterone	117	1.01
Spironolactone	67.0	1.76
Trimethyltrienolone	14.8	8.0
Megestrol acetate	13.6	8.7
Cyproterone acetate	12.5	9.5
Progesterone	6.6	18
Estradiol	4.9	24
Androstenedione	2.0	58
Canrenone	0.84	140
Flutamide	0.079	1200
Cimetidine	0.00084	140,000
Notes: (1) Human skin fibroblasts used for assays. (2) Situation in vivo is different for flutamide and spironolactone due biotransformation. (3) Conflicting findings for spironolactone. Sources: Main: Related:

Spironolactone has been found to be effective in the treatment of hirsutism in women at a dosage of as low as 50 mg/day. At dosages of 100 mg/day and 200 mg/day, observed reductions in hair shaft diameter were 19% ± 8% and 30% ± 3%, respectively (p = 0.07). Levels of free testosterone were unchanged, however, suggesting that the antiandrogenic efficacy of spironolactone was due exclusively to direct AR blockade. In addition, other studies have found that 100 mg/day spironolactone is significantly or near-significantly inferior to 500 mg/day flutamide in improving symptoms of acne and hirsutism. One study compared placebo and dosages of spironolactone of 50, 100, 150, and 200 mg/day in the treatment of acne in women and observed progressive increases in response rates up to the 200 mg/day dosage. These findings suggest that the antiandrogenic effectiveness of spironolactone is not maximal below a dosage of 200 mg/day, and are in accordance with the typical dosage range of spironolactone of 50 to 200 mg/day in women.

Studies have found that spironolactone is associated with a significantly lower risk of prostate cancer in men (HR = 0.69). This was apparent for high-dose spironolactone, using doses of 75 mg/day and above (HR = 0.74). Conversely, lower doses of spironolactone (<75 mg/day) were not associated with a decreased risk of prostate cancer (HR = 0.99). Levels of prostate-specific antigen (PSA) were assessed and were found to be significantly lower in spironolactone-treated men. The decreased incidence of prostate cancer with spironolactone was hypothesized to be due to its known antiandrogenic activity.

== Steroidogenesis inhibition ==
Spironolactone is sometimes able to significantly lower testosterone levels at high dosages in spite of not acting as an antigonadotropin, and this is thought to be due to direct enzymatic inhibition of 17α-hydroxylase and 17,20-lyase, enzymes necessary for the biosynthesis of testosterone. Although spironolactone is said to be a relatively weak inhibitor of 17α-hydroxylase and 17,20-lyase, at least compared to more potent steroidogenesis inhibitors like ketoconazole and abiraterone acetate (which can reduce testosterone concentrations to castrate levels), this action may contribute to a significant portion of the antiandrogenic activity of spironolactone, for instance lowering testosterone levels in women with hyperandrogenism and in transgender women. Canrenone inhibits steroidogenic enzymes such as 17α-hydroxylase, 17,20-lyase, 11β-hydroxylase, cholesterol side-chain cleavage enzyme, and 21-hydroxylase similarly to spironolactone, but is more potent in doing so in comparison. In spite of the findings of spironolactone and canrenone on these steroidogenic enzymes however, spironolactone has shown mixed and highly inconsistent effects on steroid hormone levels in clinical studies. In some studies, it significantly lowers testosterone levels, whereas in other studies, testosterone and estradiol levels remain unchanged, even at high dosages. It has been suggested that spironolactone may weakly and partially inhibit 17α-hydroxylase, which in turn results in upregulation of the HPG axis such that steroid hormone levels remain normal. Conversely however, inhibition of 17α-hydroxylase in the ovary may disrupt the menstrual cycle and thereby result in menstrual irregularities.

Animal studies have found that spironolactone inhibits testicular CYP450-mediated steroidogenesis by 5 to 75% across a dosage range of 1 to 100 mg/kg, with 50% inhibition occurring at a dose of 40 mg/kg. A decrease in the production of testosterone and 17α-hydroxyprogesterone due to inhibition of steroidogenic enzymes like 17α-hydroxylase has been found to occur at dosages of 40 to 200 mg/kg. For comparison, the clinical dosage range of spironolactone in humans is usually about 4 to 8 mg/kg.

There is also mixed/conflicting evidence that spironolactone may inhibit 5α-reductase, and thus the synthesis of the potent androgen DHT from testosterone, to some extent. However, the combination of spironolactone and the potent 5α-reductase inhibitor finasteride has been found to have significant improved effectiveness in the treatment of hirsutism relative to spironolactone therapy alone, suggesting that any inhibition of 5α-reductase by spironolactone is only weak or at best incomplete. Spironolactone has been found not to have activity as an aromatase inhibitor.

== Estrogenic activity ==
Spironolactone has been found to directly interact with the ER. A study using human uterine tissue found that a 1,000-fold excess of spironolactone (0.3–2 μM) resulted in no displacement of estradiol from the ER. However, a subsequent study found that the medication did interact with the human ER at higher concentrations, albeit with very low affinity (K_{i} = 20 μM). In the same study, spironolactone was administered to rats and found to produce mixed estrogenic and antiestrogenic or selective estrogen receptor modulator (SERM)-like effects that were described as very similar to those of tamoxifen. In spite of the fact that tamoxifen had two orders of magnitude higher affinity for the ER than spironolactone however, the two medications showed similar potency in vivo. The likelihood of spironolactone interacting with the ER itself is remote in consideration of its very low affinity for the receptor in vitro. However, it has been hypothesized that metabolism of spironolactone might result in active metabolites with greater ER affinity, which might potentially account for the activity. One of the major active metabolites of spironolactone, canrenone, likewise did not interact with the human uterine ER at up to a more than 5,000-fold excess (25 μM). In other research, spironolactone has been found to have no estrogenic or antiestrogenic effects in the uterus when administered by subcutaneous injection in rodents even at very high doses.

The authors of the study concluded that direct interaction of spironolactone (and/or its metabolites) with the ER could be involved in the gynecomastia, feminization, and effects on gonadotropin levels that the medication is associated with. Subsequently, it has also been suggested that, as a SERM-like medication, ER agonistic activity of spironolactone in the pituitary gland could be responsible for its antigonadotropic effects while ER antagonistic activity of spironolactone in the endometrium could be responsible for the menstrual disturbances that are associated with it. Such actions might explain these effects of spironolactone in light of the finding that it is not significantly progestogenic or antiprogestogenic in women even at high dosages.

In accordance, a study found that in women treated with a GnRH analogue, spironolactone therapy almost completely prevented the bone loss that is associated with these medications, whereas treatment with the selective AR antagonist flutamide had no such effect. Other studies have also found an inverse relationship between spironolactone and decreased bone mineral density and bone fractures in men. Estrogens are well known for maintaining and having positive effects on bone, and it has been suggested that the estrogenic activity of spironolactone may be involved in its positive effects on bone mineral density. High levels of aldosterone have been associated with adverse bone changes, and so the antimineralocorticoid activity of spironolactone might partially or fully be responsible for these effects as a potential alternative explanation.

In addition to potential direct interaction with the ER, spironolactone also has some indirect estrogenic activity, which it mediates via several actions, including:

- By acting as an antiandrogen, as androgens can suppress both estrogen production and signaling (e.g., in the breasts).
- Inhibition of the conversion of estradiol to estrone, resulting in an increase in the ratio of circulating estradiol to estrone. Estradiol is far more potent than estrone as an estrogen, which is comparatively almost inactive.
- Enhancement of the rate of peripheral conversion of testosterone into estradiol, thus decreasing the ratio of circulating testosterone to estradiol.

Spironolactone has been found to act as a reversible inhibitor of human 17β-hydroxysteroid dehydrogenase 2 (17β-HSD2), albeit with weak potency (K_{i} = 0.25–2.4 μM; IC_{50} = 0.27–1.1 μM). C7α thioalkyl derivatives of spironolactone like the 7α-thioethyl analogue were found to inhibit the enzyme with greater potency, suggesting that the actual active metabolites of spironolactone like 7α-TMS might be more potent inhibitors. 17β-HSD2 is a key enzyme responsible for inactivation of estradiol into estrone in various tissues, and inhibition of 17β-HSD2 by spironolactone may be involved in the gynecomastia and altered ratio of circulating testosterone to estradiol associated with the medication. Spironolactone has also been associated with positive effects on bone, and it is notable that 17β-HSD2 inhibitors are under investigation as potential novel treatments for osteoporosis due to their ability to prevent estradiol inactivation in this tissue. In contrast to 17β-HSD2, spironolactone does not appear to inhibit 17β-hydroxysteroid dehydrogenase 1 (17β-HSD1) in vitro.

In contrast to estrogens and SERMs, spironolactone does not increase sex hormone-binding globulin (SHBG) levels or risk of venous thromboembolism. Nor is there an increase in the risk of breast cancer or endometrial cancer with spironolactone.

Spironolactone is known to produce a high rate of menstrual irregularities in women at around the middle of the menstrual cycle, when ovulation occurs. A study investigated the effects of 100 mg/day spironolactone on the endometrium and hormone levels and the mechanism for the menstrual abnormalities associated with it in a group of women with polyendocrine metabolic ovarian syndrome (PMOS). They found that spironolactone, likely due to inhibition of steroidogenesis, blunted the surge in estradiol levels around ovulation, with estradiol levels of about 41 to 66% of normal at this time. Conversely, periovulatory levels of the gonadotropins, luteinizing hormone and follicle-stimulating hormone, were unchanged. Spironolactone significantly decreased endometrial thickness in the women (by 22 to 33%), and as estrogens stimulate endometrial growth, this effect of spironolactone may have been due to the decreased levels of estradiol. As such, spironolactone may have a functional antiestrogenic effect around ovulation in women, and this may be involved in its side effect of menstrual irregularities at high doses.

== Progestogenic activity ==
Spironolactone has weak progestogenic activity in bioassays. Its actions in this regard are a result of direct agonist activity at the PR, though with a very low half-maximal potency. Spironolactone's progestogenic activity has been suggested to be involved in some of its side effects, including the menstrual irregularities seen in women and the undesirable serum lipid profile changes that are seen at higher doses. It has also been suggested to augment the gynecomastia caused by the estrogenic effects of spironolactone, as progesterone is known to be involved in mammary gland development. A major active metabolite of spironolactone, canrenone, has been found to interact with the human uterine PR with a K_{i} of 300 nM. This is relatively weak at approximately 100-fold less than that of progesterone. In any case, levels of canrenone of up to 1,200 nM have been observed in some studies with 100 to 200 mg doses of spironolactone.

It has been widely stated that the menstrual irregularities associated with spironolactone are due to its progestogenic activity, and animal studies, both in rabbits and rhesus monkeys, have shown clear progestogenic effects of spironolactone. However, the dosages of spironolactone used in animals to produce progestogenic effects were very high (50–200 mg/kg/day in rabbits, 400 mg/day in rhesus monkeys). In one study, the threshold dose by subcutaneous injection for endometrial transformation in rabbits was 0.003–0.01 mg for cyproterone acetate, 0.1–0.3 mg for drospirenone, 0.5 mg for progesterone, and 10–20 mg for spironolactone. Spironolactone taken orally at 40 mg/kg/day failed to show an antigonadotropic effect or decrease testosterone levels in male cynomolgus monkeys, whereas oral drospirenone at 4 mg/day was effective and strongly suppressed testosterone levels. In addition, evidence of neither progestogenic nor antiprogestogenic effects (as assessed by endometrial changes) have been observed in women even with high doses of spironolactone. As such, the progestogenic potency of spironolactone appears to be below the level of clinical significance in humans. Moreover, the menstrual abnormalities associated with spironolactone must have a different cause. Suggestions for other possible mechanisms for the menstrual disturbances of spironolactone include interference with the hypothalamic–pituitary–gonadal axis, inhibition of enzymatic steroidogenesis, and mixed estrogenic and antiestrogenic activity.

== Antigonadotropic effects ==
Pure AR antagonists like flutamide and bicalutamide are potent progonadotropins with indirect estrogenic activity in males. This is because they block the AR in the pituitary gland and hypothalamus and thereby inhibit the negative feedback of androgens on the hypothalamic–pituitary–gonadal axis (HPG axis). This, in turn, results in increased gonadotropin secretion, activation of gonadal steroidogenesis, and an increase in the levels of estradiol (2.5-fold) and testosterone (up to 2-fold). Conversely, AR antagonists that are also progestogens, like cyproterone acetate, are not progonadotropic, as activation of the PR is antigonadotropic and preserves negative feedback on the HPG axis, and these medications are indeed potently antigonadotropic in clinical practice.

Although spironolactone is an AR antagonist with no significant progestogenic effects in women even at high dosages and hence acts like a pure AR antagonist, many studies have not found it to be progonadotropic in men, nor to increase testosterone or estradiol levels. Moreover, spironolactone is also said to possess very little or no antigonadotropic activity (in terms of lowering gonadotropin levels to below normal) even at high dosages, although conflicting reports exist. Nonetheless, since spironolactone does not generally increase gonadotropin levels in spite of inhibition of androgen signaling, it must have some degree of antigonadotropic activity sufficient to at least keep the HPG axis from being upregulated. As estrogens, like progestogens, have antigonadotropic activity, and as SERM-like activity has been described for spironolactone, the antigonadotropic effects of spironolactone may be due to estrogenic activity.

== Glucocorticoid activity ==
Spironolactone weakly binds to and acts as an antagonist of the GR, showing antiglucocorticoid properties, but to a significant degree only at very high concentrations that are probably not clinically relevant.

Most studies have found that spironolactone has no effect on cortisol levels. However, some studies have observed increased cortisol levels with spironolactone treatment, possibly because of the antimineralocorticoid activity of spironolactone, which prevents negative feedback of mineralocorticoids like aldosterone on the hypothalamic–pituitary–adrenal axis (HPA axis), and thereby upregulates adrenocorticotropic hormone (ACTH) and adrenal gland synthesis of corticosteroids such as cortisol and aldosterone. Although spironolactone usually doesn't affect cortisol levels, it does significantly increase concentrations of aldosterone.

Spironolactone has been shown to weakly inhibit 11β-hydroxylase in vitro. This enzyme is responsible for the transformation of 11-deoxycorticosterone into corticosterone and of 11-deoxycortisol into cortisol. The clinical significance of this action, if any, is unclear. Spironolactone notably does not decrease cortisol or aldosterone levels.

== Other activities ==
Spironolactone is an agonist of the pregnane X receptor (PXR), a xenobiotic-sensing receptor. By activating the PXR, spironolactone induces the expression of cytochrome P450 CYP3A enzymes and of the ATP-binding cassette transporter (ABC transporters) P-glycoprotein (multidrug resistance protein 1; MRP1; ABCB1) and multidrug resistance protein 2 (MRP2; ABCC2). These proteins are involved in the metabolism and elimination of xenobiotics, and as a result, their induction by spironolactone may contribute to drug interactions of spironolactone. Examples of such interactions include oral digoxin and estradiol.

There is evidence that spironolactone may block voltage-dependent Ca^{2+} channels and voltage-gated potassium (K^{+}) channels.

Spironolactone has been identified as an inhibitor of NRG1‐ERBB4 signaling.

Spironolactone has been found to act as a potent inhibitor of the pannexin 1 channel, and this action appears to be involved in its antihypertensive effects independently of MR antagonism.

Spironolactone has been found to block hERG channels.

== Hormone levels ==
A 2 sysreview of 18 studies found that spironolactone shows no significant effects on levels of estrogen, estradiol, testosterone, androstened, dehydroep sulfate, luteinizing hormone, or follicle-stimulating hormone in women. A 2017 hybrid systematic review reported that data from 50 studies on androgen levels with spironolactone in women were equivocal. A 1993 review reported that changes in hormone levels with spironolactone were very heterogeneous, with most changes not achieving significance. Levels of cortisol were unchanged in all studies (four total) and levels of dehydroepiandrosterone sulfate were unchanged in all but one of seven studies. However, it was reported that testosterone levels were decreased in 81% of the studies (13 of 16). However, neither of the two placebo-controlled trials in the review found a significant difference in testosterone levels between the placebo and treatment groups. A 1991 review reported that the influences of spironolactone on androgen levels in women were variable and inconsistent.

Spironolactone has shown no significant effect on levels of testosterone, estradiol, luteinizing hormone, and follicle-stimulating hormone in men.

No or only small changes in cortisol levels have been observed in clinical studies with spironolactone.

The influence of canrenoate potassium on cortisol levels has been studied.

Spironolactone has no influence on sex hormone-binding globulin levels in women or men.
