= Anticorticosteroid =

Anticorticosteroids or anticorticoids are drugs which oppose the actions of corticosteroids. They include:

- Antiglucocorticoids – e.g., mifepristone, ketoconazole, aminoglutethimide
- Antimineralocorticoids – e.g., spironolactone, canrenone, eplerenone
