= Fais =

Fais may refer to:

- Fais, Dutch singer-songwriter of Dutch and Moroccan descent.
- Fais Island, one of the outer islands of the State of Yap part of the Federated States of Micronesia
- Fabric Application Interface Standard
- French American International School (disambiguation)

== See also ==
- FAI (disambiguation)
