= C23H32O4S =

The molecular formula C_{23}H_{32}O_{4}S (molar mass: 404.563 g/mol) may refer to:

- 6β-Hydroxy-7α-thiomethylspironolactone
- 7α-Thiomethylspironolactone sulfoxide
