= 7α-Thiospironolactone =

Chemical compound

Clinical data
- Other names: 7α-TS; SC-24813; Deacetylspironolactone; Mercaptospironolactone; 17α-Hydroxy-7α-mercapto-3-oxopregn-4-ene-21-carboxylic acid γ-lactone
- Drug class: Antimineralocorticoid; Antiandrogen

Identifiers
- IUPAC name: (7R,8R,9S,10R,13S,14S,17R)-10,13-Dimethyl-7-sulfanylspiro[2,6,7,8,9,11,12,14,15,16-decahydro-1H-cyclopenta[a]phenanthrene-17,5'-oxolane]-2',3-dione
- CAS Number: 38753-76-3
- PubChem CID: 119472
- ChemSpider: 58817151
- UNII: 4LH70U7H4Z
- ChEMBL: ChEMBL3544689
- CompTox Dashboard (EPA): DTXSID20959566

Chemical and physical data
- Formula: C_{22}H_{30}O_{3}S
- Molar mass: 374.54 g·mol^{−1}
- 3D model (JSmol): Interactive image
- SMILES: C[C@]12CCC(=O)C=C1C[C@H]([C@@H]3[C@@H]2CC[C@]4([C@H]3CC[C@@]45CCC(=O)O5)C)S
- InChI: InChI=1S/C22H30O3S/c1-20-7-3-14(23)11-13(20)12-17(26)19-15(20)4-8-21(2)16(19)5-9-22(21)10-6-18(24)25-22/h11,15-17,19,26H,3-10,12H2,1-2H3/t15-,16-,17+,19+,20-,21-,22+/m0/s1; Key:NZCDWYJROUPYPT-NYTLBARGSA-N

7α-Thiospironolactone (7α-TS; developmental code name SC-24813; also known as deacetylspironolactone) is a steroidal antimineralocorticoid and antiandrogen of the spirolactone group and a minor active metabolite of spironolactone. Other important metabolites of spironolactone include 7α-thiomethylspironolactone (7α-TMS; SC-26519), 6β-hydroxy-7α-thiomethylspironolactone (6β-OH-7α-TMS), and canrenone (SC-9376).

Spironolactone is a prodrug with a short terminal half-life of 1.4 hours. The active metabolites of spironolactone have extended terminal half-lives of 13.8 hours for 7α-TMS, 15.0 hours for 6β-OH-7α-TMS, and 16.5 hours for canrenone, and accordingly, these metabolites are responsible for the therapeutic effects of the drug.

7α-TS and 7α-TMS have been found to possess approximately equivalent affinity for the rat ventral prostate androgen receptor (AR) relative to that of spironolactone. The affinity of 7α-TS, 7α-TMS, and spironolactone for the rat prostate AR is about 3.0 to 8.5% of that of dihydrotestosterone (DHT).

7α-TS, via a reactive metabolite formed by 17α-hydroxylase, is a suicide inhibitor of 17α-hydroxylase, and is thought to be involved in the inhibition of 17α-hydroxylase by spironolactone.

Pharmacokinetics of spironolactone and metabolites
Compound	C_{max} (ng/mL) (day 1)	C_{max} (ng/mL) (day 15)	AUC (ng•hr/ml) (day 15)	t_{1/2} (hr)
Spironolactone	72	80	231	1.4
Canrenone	155	181	2173	16.5
7α-TMS	359	391	2804	13.8
6β-OH-7α-TMS	101	125	1727	15.0

A study assessed the interaction of spironolactone and 7α-TS with sex hormone-binding globulin and found that they had very low affinity for this carrier protein.

== See also ==
- 7α-Thioprogesterone
