= Sex hormone–binding globulin =

Human glycoprotein that binds to androgens and estrogens

SHBG
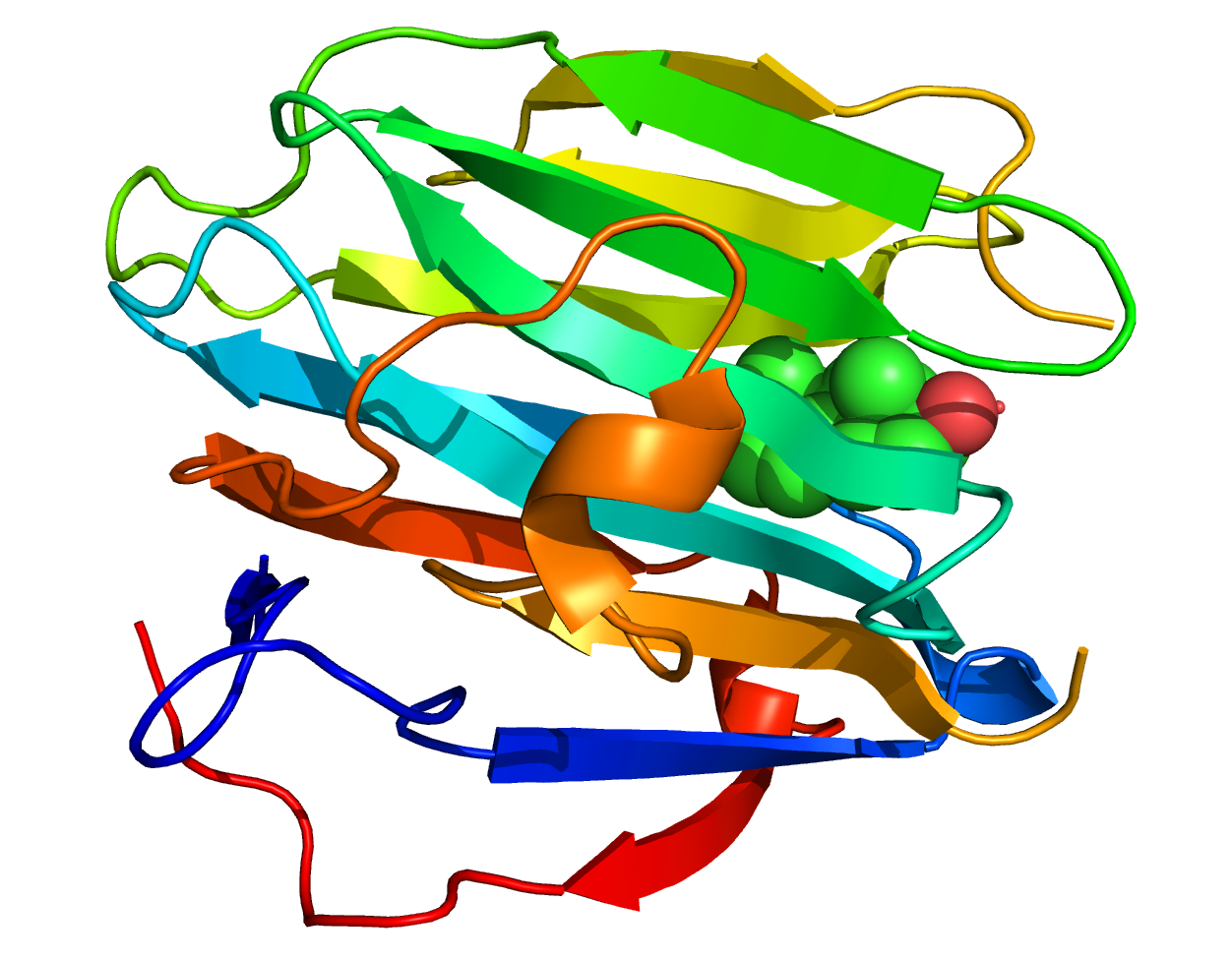

Identifiers
- Aliases: SHBG, ABP, SBP, TEBG, sex hormone binding globulin, Sex hormone-binding globulin
- External IDs: OMIM: 182205; MGI: 98295; GeneCards: SHBG
Available structures
PDB	Ortholog search: PDBe RCSB
PDB	List of PDB id codes 1LHW, 1D2S, 1F5F, 1KDK, 1KDM, 1LHN, 1LHO, 1LHU, 1LHV

Gene location (Human)
Chr.	Chromosome 17 (human)
Band	17p13.1	Start	7,613,946 bp
Band	17p13.1	End	7,633,382 bp

Gene location (Mouse)
Chr.	Chromosome 11 (mouse)
Band	11 B3|11 42.86 cM	Start	69,505,630 bp
Band	11 B3|11 42.86 cM	End	69,508,731 bp
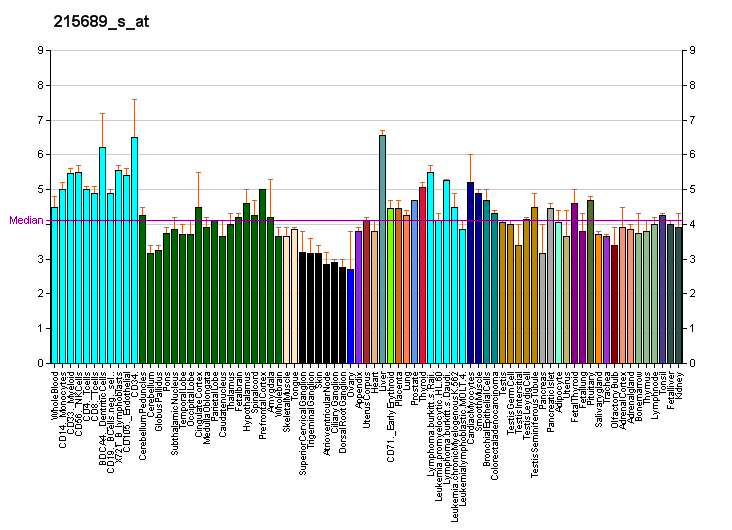
RNA expression pattern
Bgee	Human / Mouse (ortholog); Top expressed in: right lobe of liver; testicle; right testis; left testis; right adrenal cortex; duodenum; jejunal mucosa; left adrenal gland; left adrenal cortex; human kidney / Top expressed in: morula; spermatocyte; embryo; Ileal epithelium; testicle; perirhinal cortex; entorhinal cortex; embryo; choroid plexus of fourth ventricle; CA3 field; More reference expression data
BioGPS	More reference expression data
Orthologs
Databases	NCBI: entry; OMA: entry
Species	Human	Mouse
Entrez	6462	20415
Ensembl	ENSG00000129214	ENSMUSG00000005202
UniProt	P04278	P97497
RefSeq (mRNA)	NM_001040; NM_001146279; NM_001146280; NM_001146281; NM_001289113 NM_001289114; NM_001289115; NM_001289116	NM_011367
RefSeq (protein)	NP_001031; NP_001139751; NP_001139752; NP_001139753; NP_001276042 NP_001276043; NP_001276044; NP_001276045	NP_035497
Location (UCSC)	Chr 17: 7.61 – 7.63 Mb	Chr 11: 69.51 – 69.51 Mb
PubMed search
- Wikidata
View/Edit Human	View/Edit Mouse

Androgen-binding protein, Sex hormone-binding globulin

Identifiers
- Symbol: SHBG
- Alt. symbols: ABP
- NCBI gene: 6462
- HGNC: 10839
- OMIM: 182205
- RefSeq: NM_001040
- UniProt: P04278

Other data
- Locus: Chr. 17 p13-p12
Search for
- Structures: Swiss-model
- Domains: InterPro

Sex hormone-binding globulin (SHBG) or sex steroid-binding globulin (SSBG) is a glycoprotein that binds to androgens and estrogens. When produced by the Sertoli cells in the seminiferous tubules of the testis, it is called androgen-binding protein (ABP).

Other steroid hormones such as progesterone, cortisol, and other corticosteroids are bound by transcortin. SHBG is found in all vertebrates apart from birds.

== Function ==
Testosterone and estradiol circulate in the bloodstream where 33-70% are loosely bound to serum albumin (depending on the sex and hormone), and most of the remaining is bound tightly to SHBG. Only a very small fraction of about 1 to 4% is unbound, or "free," and thus biologically active and able to enter a cell and activate its receptor. SHBG inhibits the function of these hormones. Thus, the local bioavailability of sex hormones is influenced by the level of SHBG. Because SHBG binds to testosterone (T) and dihydrotestosterone (DHT), these hormones are made less lipophilic and become concentrated within the luminal fluid of the seminiferous tubules. The higher levels of these hormones enable spermatogenesis in the seminiferous tubules and sperm maturation in the epididymis. SHBG's production is regulated under the influence of FSH on Sertoli cells, enhanced by insulin, retinol, and testosterone.

The relative binding affinity of various sex steroids for SHBG is dihydrotestosterone (DHT) > testosterone > androstenediol > estradiol > estrone. DHT binds to SHBG with about 5 times the affinity of testosterone and about 20 times the affinity of estradiol. Dehydroepiandrosterone (DHEA) is weakly bound to SHBG, but dehydroepiandrosterone sulfate is not bound to SHBG. Androstenedione is not bound to SHBG either, and is instead bound solely to albumin. Estrone sulfate and estriol are also poorly bound by SHBG. Less than 1% of progesterone is bound to SHBG.

SHBG levels are usually about twice as high in women as in men. In women, SHBG serves to limit exposure to both androgens and estrogens. Low SHBG levels in women have been associated with hyperandrogenism and endometrial cancer due to heightened exposure to androgens and estrogens, respectively. During pregnancy, due to activation of SHBG production in the liver by high estrogen levels, SHBG levels increase by five-fold to ten-fold. The high SHBG levels during pregnancy may serve to protect the mother from exposure to fetal androgens that escape metabolism by the placenta. A case report of severe hyperandrogenism in a pregnant woman due to a rare instance of genetic SHBG deficiency illustrates this.

== Biochemistry ==
=== Biosynthesis ===
SHBG is produced mostly by the liver and is released into the bloodstream. Other sites that produce SHBG include the brain, uterus, testes, and placenta. Testes-produced SHBG is called androgen-binding protein.

== Gene ==
The gene for SHBG is called Shbg, located on chromosome 17 on the short arm between the bands 17p12→p13. Overlapping on the complementary DNA strand is the gene for spermidine/spermine N1-acetyltransferase family member 2 (SAT2). Nearby are the genes for p53 and ATP1B2, and fragile X mental retardation, autosomal homolog 2 (FXR2) on the complementary strand. There are eight exons, of which exon 1 has three variations called 1L, 1T and 1N which are triggered by three promoters: P_{L}, P_{T} and P_{N} respectively. SHBG comes with the 1L, 2, 3, 4, 5, 6, 7, and 8 exons connected together. A variation includes SHBG-T which is missing exon 7 but with exon 1T promoted by promoter P_{T} on the opposite strand, which shared with that for SAT2.

=== Polymorphisms ===
There are variations in the genetic material for this protein that have different effects. In humans common polymorphisms include the following:

Rs6259, also called Asp327Asn location 7633209 on chromosome 17, results in there being an extra N-glycosylation site, and so an extra sugar can be attached. This results in a longer circulation half-life for the protein, and raised levels. Health effects include a lowered risk of endometrial cancer and an increased risk of systemic lupus erythematosus.

Rs6258 also called Ser156Pro is at position 7631360 on chromosome 17.

Rs727428 position 7634474 is in several percent of humans.

(TAAAA)(n) is five base pairs that repeats a variable number of times on the opposite DNA strand.

== Promoter activation ==
The mechanism of activating the promoter for SHBG in the liver involves hepatocyte nuclear factor 4 alpha (HNF4A) binding to a DR1-like cis-element which then stimulates production. Competing with HNF4A at a third site on the promoter is PPARG-2 which reduces copying the gene to RNA. If the HNF4A level is low, then COUP-TF binds to the first site and turns off production of SHBG.

== Protein ==
Sex hormone-binding globulin is homodimeric, meaning it has two identical peptide chains making up its structure. The amino acid sequence is the same as for androgen-binding protein produced in testes, but with different oligosaccharides attached.

SHBG has two laminin G-like domains which form pockets that bind hydrophobic molecules. The steroids are bound by the LG domain at the amino end of the protein. Inside the pocket of the domain is a serine residue that attracts the two different types of steroids at different points, thus changing their orientation. Androgens bind at the C3 functional groups on the A ring, and estrogens bind via a hydroxyl attached to C17 on the D ring. The two different orientations change a loop over the entrance to the pocket and the position of trp84 (in humans). Thus the whole protein signals what hormone it carries on its own surface. The steroid binding LG domain is coded by exons 2 to 5. A linker region joins the two LG domains together.

When first produced, the SHBG precursor has a leading signal peptide attached with 29 amino acids. The remaining peptide has 373 amino acids. There are two sulfur bridges.

The sugars are attached at two different N-glycosylation points on asparagine (351 and 367) and one O-glycosylation point (7) on threonine.

=== Metals ===
A calcium ion is needed to link the two elements of the dimer together. Also a zinc ion is used to orient an otherwise disorganised part of the peptide chain.

== Regulation ==
SHBG has both enhancing and inhibiting hormonal influences and thus can be viewed as a hepatokine. It decreases with high levels of insulin, growth hormone, insulin-like growth factor 1 (IGF-1), androgens, prolactin and transcortin. High estrogen and thyroxine levels cause it to increase.

In an effort to explain obesity-related reductions in SHBG, recent evidence suggests sugar or monosaccharide-induced hepatic lipogenesis, hepatic lipids in general, and cytokines like TNF-alpha and interleukins reduce SHBG, whereas insulin does not. For example, anti-psoriatic drugs that inhibit TNF-alpha cause an increase in SHBG. The common downstream mechanism for all of these, including the effect of thyroid hormones, was downregulation of hepatocyte nuclear factor 4 (HNF4).

== Blood values ==
Reference ranges for blood tests for SHBG have been developed:

Population	Range
Adult female, premenopausal	40–120 nmol/L
Adult female, postmenopausal	28–112 nmol/L
Adult male	20–60 nmol/L
Infant (1–23 months)	60–252 nmol/L
Prepubertal (2–8 years)	72–220 nmol/L
Pubertal female	36–125 nmol/L
Pubertal male	16–100 nmol/L

== Clinical significance ==
=== High or low levels ===
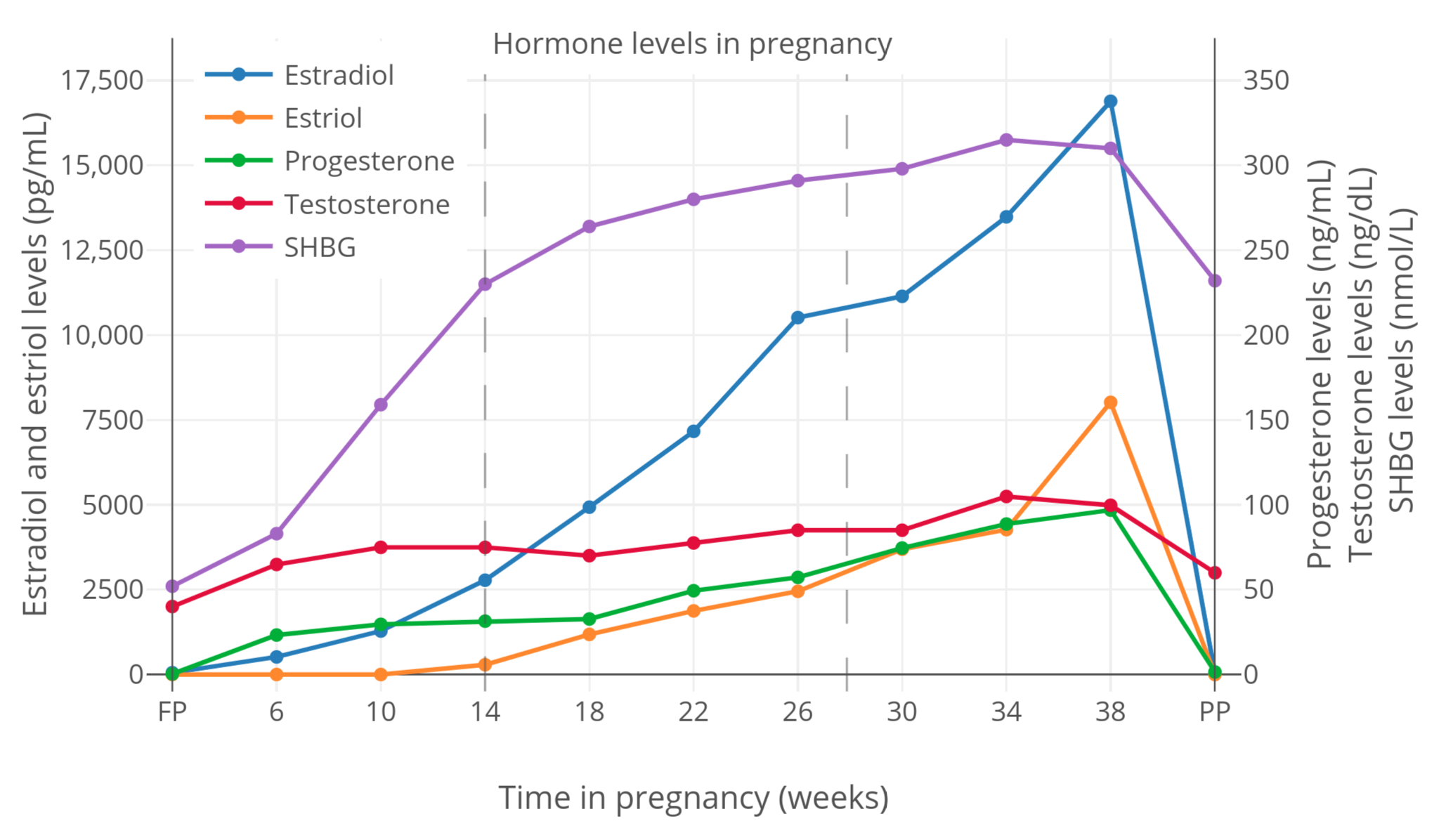
Levels of sex hormones and SHBG during pregnancy in women.

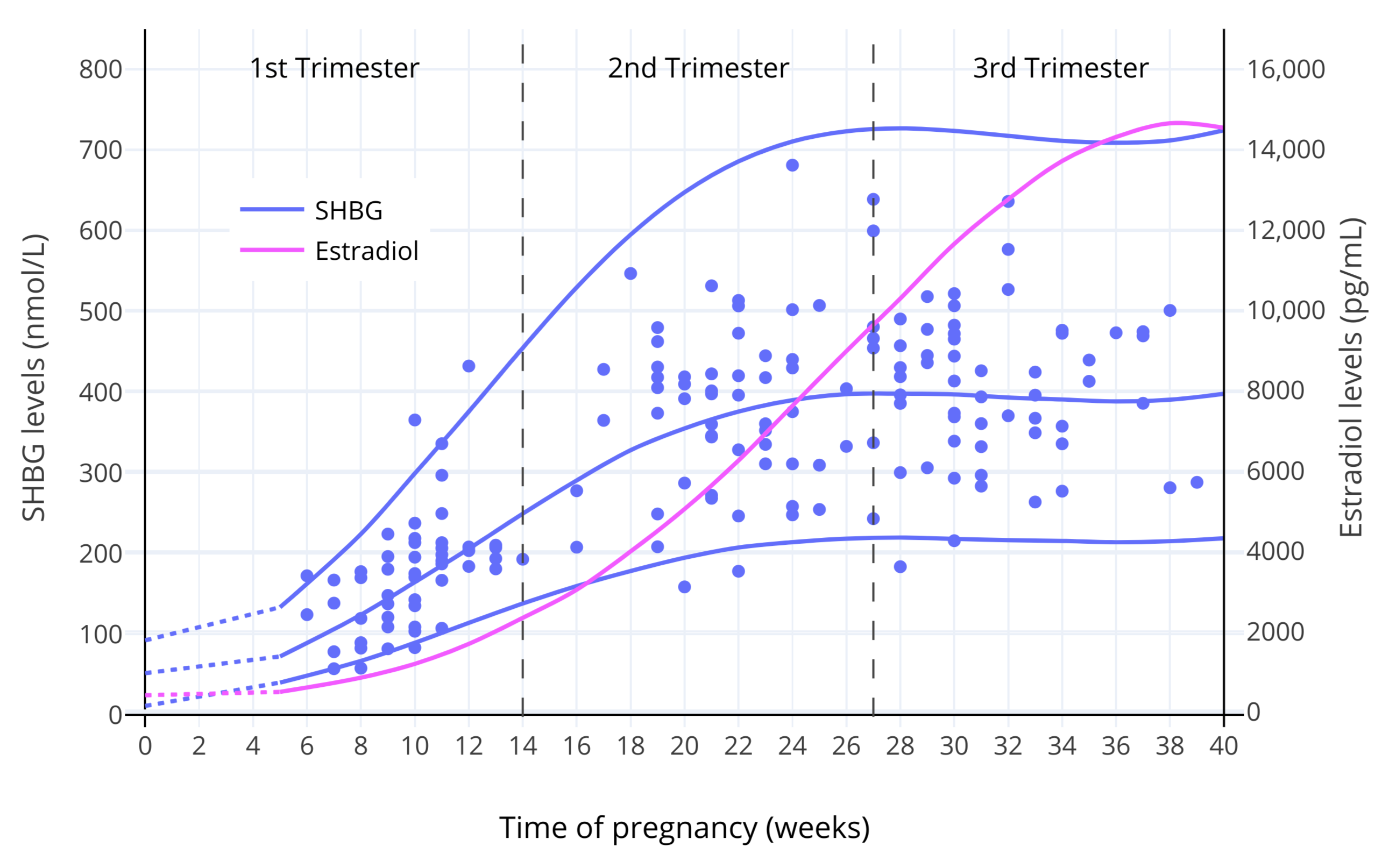
Levels of SHBG and estradiol during pregnancy in women. For SHBG the lines are the mean and 95th percentile levels while the points are individual measurements. For estradiol the line is the mean level. The dashed parts of the lines are extrapolated.

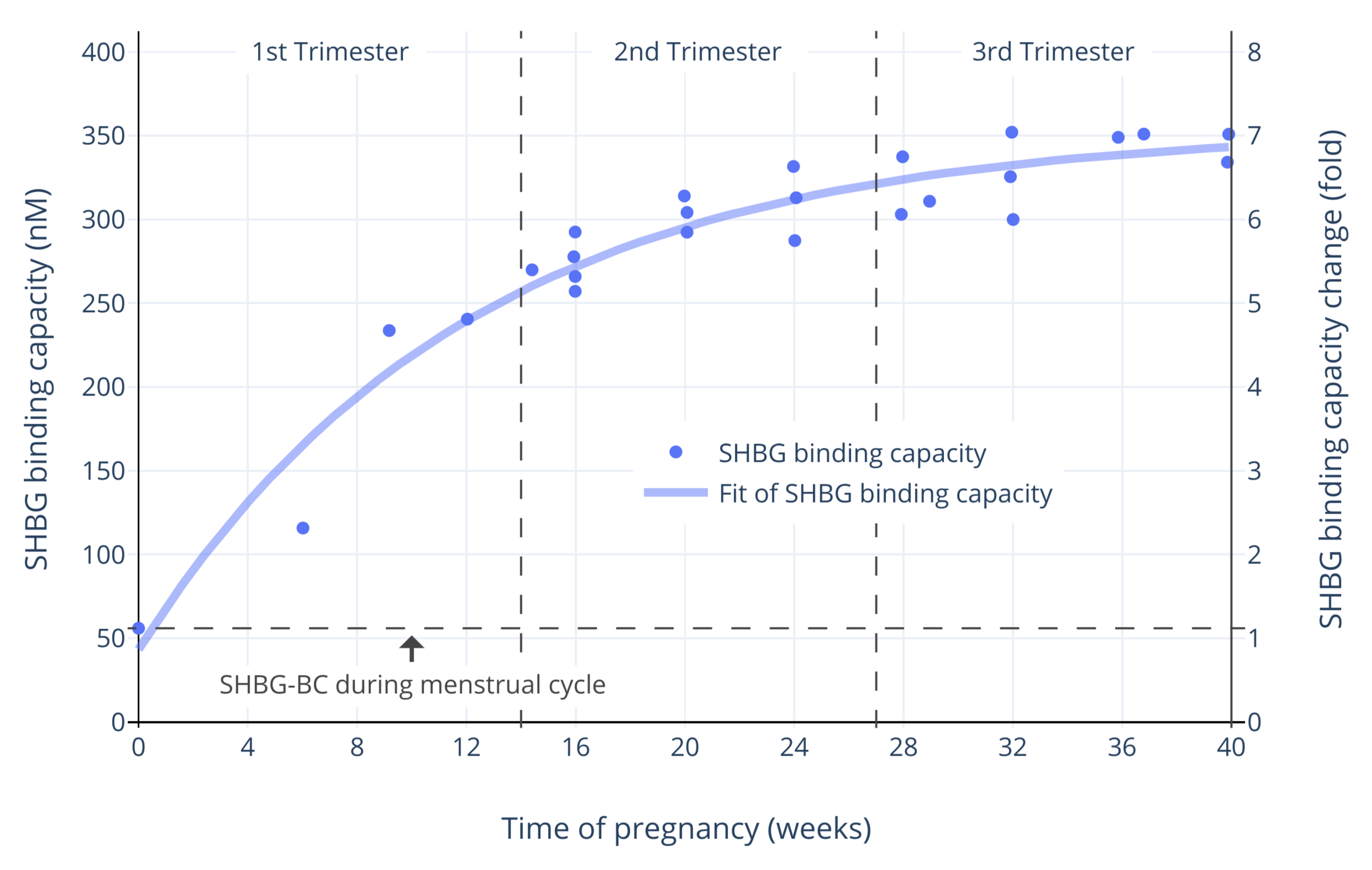
SHBG binding capacity during pregnancy in women.

SHBG levels are decreased by androgens, administration of anabolic steroids, polyendocrine metabolic ovarian syndrome (PMOS), hypothyroidism, obesity, Cushing's syndrome, and acromegaly. Low SHBG levels increase the probability of type 2 diabetes. SHBG levels increase with estrogenic states (oral contraceptives), pregnancy, hyperthyroidism, cirrhosis, anorexia nervosa, and certain drugs. Long-term calorie restriction increases SHBG in rodents and men, while lowering free and total testosterone and estradiol and having no effect on DHEA-S, which lacks affinity for SHBG. PMOS is associated with insulin resistance and excess insulin lowers SHBG, which increases free testosterone levels.

In utero, the human fetus has a low level of SHBG, allowing increased activity of sex hormones. After birth, the SHBG level rises and remains at a high level throughout childhood. At puberty the SHBG level halves in girls and goes down to a quarter in boys. The change at puberty is triggered by growth hormone, and its pulsatility differs in boys and girls. In the third trimester of pregnancy, the SHBG level of the parent escalates to five to ten times the usual level for a woman. A hypothesis is that this protects against the effect of hormone produced by the fetus.

Obese girls are more likely to have an early menarche due to lower levels of SHBG. Anorexia or a lean physique in women leads to higher SHBG levels, which in turn can lead to amenorrhea.

=== Type 2 diabetes ===
Reduced levels of SHBG and also certain polymorphisms of the SHBG gene are implicated in the development of insulin resistance and type 2 diabetes. Such effects apparently involve direct action at the cellular level where it became apparent that cell membranes of certain tissues contain specific high-affinity SHBG receptors.

=== Coagulation ===
SHBG is a useful correlate and indirect marker of estrogen-induced procoagulation and by extension thrombosis, for instance with birth control pills.

=== Medications ===
Oral contraceptives containing ethinylestradiol can increase SHBG levels 2- to 4-fold and decrease free testosterone concentrations by 40 to 80% in women. They can be used to treat symptoms of hyperandrogenism like acne and hirsutism. Some oral contraceptives, namely those containing high doses of ethinylestradiol (which have been discontinued and are no longer marketed), can increase SHBG levels as much as 5- to 10-fold.

Some medications, such as certain anabolic steroids like mesterolone and danazol and certain progestins like levonorgestrel and norethisterone, have high affinity for SHBG and can bind to it and displace endogenous steroids from it, thereby increasing free concentrations of these endogenous steroids. It has been estimated that therapeutic levels of danazol, methyltestosterone, fluoxymesterone, levonorgestrel, and norethisterone would respectively occupy or displace from testosterone 83–97%, 48–69%, 42–64%, 16–47%, and 4–39% of SHBG binding sites, while others with low affinity for SHBG such as ethinylestradiol, cyproterone acetate, and medroxyprogesterone acetate would occupy or displace from testosterone 1% or fewer SHBG binding sites.

Selective androgen receptor modulators (SARMs) also reduce SHBG.

Affinities of 70 medications for SHBG and CBG
Compound	Structure	SHBG RBA (%)	SHBG K (10^{6} M^{−1})	CBG RBA (%)	CBG K (10^{6} M^{−1})
Aminoglutethimide	Nonsteroidal	<0.01	<0.2	<0.1	<0.1
Androstanolone	Steroidal	220	5500	1.3	0.83
Betamethasone	Steroidal	<0.01	<0.2	<0.1	<0.1
Cholecalciferol	Steroidal	<0.01	<0.2	<0.1	<0.1
Cimetidine	Nonsteroidal	<0.01	<0.2	<0.1	<0.1
Clomifene	Nonsteroidal	<0.01	<0.2	<0.1	<0.1
Cortisol (hydrocortisone)	Steroidal	0.13	1.6	100	76
Cortisone acetate	Steroidal	0.10	1.2	<0.1	<0.1
Cyproterone acetate	Steroidal	0.10	1.2	<0.1	<0.1
Danazol	Steroidal	18	240	10	6.5
Dexamethasone	Steroidal	<0.01	<0.2	<0.1	<0.1
Diazoxide	Nonsteroidal	<0.01	<0.2	<0.1	<0.1
Diethylstilbestrol	Nonsteroidal	<0.01	<0.2	<0.1	<0.1
Digitoxin	Steroidal	<0.01	<0.2	<0.1	<0.1
Digoxin	Steroidal	<0.01	<0.2	<0.1	<0.1
DL-DOPA	Nonsteroidal	<0.01	<0.2	<0.1	<0.1
Dopamine	Nonsteroidal	<0.01	<0.2	<0.1	<0.1
Enclomiphene	Nonsteroidal	<0.01	<0.2	<0.1	<0.1
Epinephrine	Nonsteroidal	<0.01	<0.2	<0.1	<0.1
Estradiol	Steroidal	49	680	<0.1	<0.1
Estradiol benzoate	Steroidal	0.70	8.6	<0.1	<0.1
Ethinylestradiol	Steroidal	0.80	9.9	<0.1	<0.1
Ethisterone	Steroidal	55	780	0.33	0.21
Fludrocortisone	Steroidal	<0.01	<0.2	0.74	0.47
Fluoxymesterone	Steroidal	4.8	60	<0.1	<0.1
Flutamide	Nonsteroidal	<0.01	<0.2	<0.1	<0.1
Homovanillic acid	Nonsteroidal	<0.01	<0.2	<0.1	<0.1
Hydrocortisone hemisuccinate	Steroidal	<0.01	<0.2	8.7	5.6
Indometacin	Nonsteroidal	<0.01	<0.2	<0.1	<0.1
Levonorgestrel	Steroidal	31	420	<0.1	<0.1
Medroxyprogesterone	Steroidal	0.15	1.9	13	8.1
Medroxyprogesterone acetate	Steroidal	0.08	1.0	6.5	4.2
Melatonin	Nonsteroidal	<0.01	<0.2	<0.1	<0.1
Mesterolone	Steroidal	180	3600	<0.1	<0.1
Mestranol	Steroidal	<0.01	<0.2	<0.1	<0.1
Methoxytryptophol	Nonsteroidal	<0.01	<0.2	<0.1	<0.1
Methyldopa	Nonsteroidal	<0.01	<0.2	<0.1	<0.1
Methylserotonin	Nonsteroidal	<0.01	<0.2	<0.1	<0.1
Methyltestosterone	Steroidal	39	530	<0.1	<0.1
Metiamide	Nonsteroidal	<0.01	<0.2	<0.1	<0.1
Metribolone	Steroidal	1.7	21	0.36	0.23
Metyrapone	Nonsteroidal	<0.01	<0.2	<0.1	<0.1
Mexrenone	Steroidal	<0.01	<0.2	<0.1	<0.1
Nafoxidine	Nonsteroidal	<0.01	<0.2	<0.1	<0.1
Nandrolone	Steroidal	5.8	72	0.10	0.63
Norepinephrine	Nonsteroidal	<0.01	<0.2	<0.1	<0.1
Norethisterone	Steroidal	11	140	0.28	0.18
Noretynodrel	Steroidal	1.3	16	0.16	0.10
Normetanephrine	Nonsteroidal	<0.01	<0.2	<0.1	<0.1
Phenytoin	Nonsteroidal	<0.01	<0.2	<0.1	<0.1
Potassium canrenoate	Steroidal	0.18	2.2	0.83	0.53
Prednisolone	Steroidal	0.04	0.49	59	41
Prednisone	Steroidal	0.17	2.1	5.0	3.2
Progesterone	Steroidal	0.71	8.8	36	24
Promegestone	Steroidal	0.007	0.09	0.40	0.25
Prorenone	Steroidal	8.2	100	<0.1	<0.1
Reserpine	Nonsteroidal	<0.01	<0.2	<0.1	<0.1
Rifampin	Nonsteroidal	<0.01	<0.2	<0.1	<0.1
Serotonin	Nonsteroidal	<0.01	<0.2	<0.1	<0.1
Spironolactone	Steroidal	0.03	0.37	<0.1	<0.1
Tamoxifen	Nonsteroidal	<0.01	<0.2	<0.1	<0.1
Testolactone	Steroidal	<0.01	<0.2	<0.1	<0.1
Testosterone	Steroidal	100	1600	8.3	5.3
Testosterone enanthate	Steroidal	0.007	0.086	<0.1	<0.1
7α-Thioprogesterone	Steroidal	0.06	0.74	36	24
7α-Thiospironolactone	Steroidal	0.59	7.3	<0.1	<0.1
Thyroxine	Nonsteroidal	<0.01	<0.2	<0.1	<0.1
Triiodothyronine	Nonsteroidal	<0.01	<0.2	<0.1	<0.1
Trimethyltrienolone	Steroidal	0.90	11	0.11	0.07
Vanillylmandelic acid	Nonsteroidal	<0.01	<0.2	<0.1	<0.1
Zuclomifene	Nonsteroidal	<0.01	<0.2	<0.1	<0.1
The reference ligands (100%) for the RBA (%) values were testosterone for SHBG and cortisol for CBG.

Affinities of 21 progestins for SHBG and CBG
Progestogen	SHBG (%)	CBG (%)
17α-Allyl-19-nortestosterone	<1	?
Allylestrenol	<1	?
Chlormadinone acetate	<1	<1
Cyproterone acetate	<1	<1
Desogestrel	<1	<1
Dienogest	<1	<1
Drospirenone	<1	<1
Etonogestrel	15	<1
Gestodene	40	<1
Levonorgestrel	50	<1
Medroxyprogesterone acetate	<1	<1
Megestrol acetate	<1	<1
Nomegestrol acetate	<1	<1
Norelgestromin	<1	?
Norethisterone	16	<1
Noretynodrel	<1	<1
Norgestimate	<1	<1
Progesterone	<1	36
Promegestone	<1	<1
Segesterone acetate	<1	?
Δ^{4}-Tibolone	1	<1
Values are RBAs (%). The reference ligand (100%) for SHBG was dihydrotestosterone and for CBG was cortisol.

Affinities of 14 AAS for SHBG
Compound	SHBG (%)
5α-Androstane-3β,17β-diol	17
5β-Androstane-3α,17β-diol	5
Dihydrotestosterone	100
Ethylestrenol	<1
Fluoxymesterone	<1
Mesterolone	440
Metandienone	2
Metenolone	3
Methyltestosterone	5
Metribolone	<1
Nandrolone	1
Oxymetholone	<1
Stanozolol	1
Testosterone	19
Values are RBAs (%). The reference ligand (100%) for SHBG was dihydrotestosterone.

Affinities of 41 steroids for SHBG
Compound	SHBG (%)
3β-Androstanediol	100
Androstenediol	77
Bolandiol	24
Dihydroethisterone	100
Dihydroethyltestosterone	18–21
Dihydromethylandrostenediol	77
Dihydronandrolone	44
Dihydrotestosterone	100
Dihydrotrestolone	47
4,17α-Dimethyltestosterone	97
Drostanolone	39
Ethisterone	92
Fluoxymesterone	3
11-Ketodihydrotestosterone	0
Medroxyprogesterone acetate	16
Megestrol acetate	0
Mestanolone	84
Methasterone	58
Methyl-1-testosterone	69
Methylandrostenediol	40
Methyltestosterone	64
Mibolerone	6
Nandrolone	16
Nandrolone decanoate	0
Nandrolone phenylpropionate	0
Norethandrolone	3
Norethisterone	21
Normethandrone	7
Oxandrolone	0
Oxymetholone	3
Progesterone	13
Stanozolol	36
1-Testosterone	98
Testosterone	82
Testosterone benzoate	8
Testosterone cypionate	6
Testosterone enanthate	9
Δ^{4}-Tibolone	8
Trestolone	12
Trestolone enanthate	12
Vinyltestosterone	36
Values are RBAs (%). The reference ligand (100%) for SHBG was dihydrotestosterone.

Affinities of 11 steroids for SHBG and CBG
Compound	SHBG (%)	CBG (%)
Aldosterone	<0.2	6.0
Corticosterone	<0.2	107
Cortisol	<0.2	100
Dexamethasone	<0.2	<0.1
Dihydrotestosterone	100	0.8
Estradiol	8.7	<0.1
Metribolone	0.2	<0.1
Moxestrol	<0.2	<0.1
Progesterone	<0.2	25
Promegestone	<0.2	0.9
Testosterone	26	3
Values are RBAs (%). The reference ligand (100%) for SHBG was dihydrotestosterone and for CBG was cortisol.

Affinities of 9 estrogens for SHBG
Compound	RBA to SHBG (%)	Bound to SHBG (%)	Bound to albumin (%)
17β-Estradiol	50	37	61
Estrone	12	16	80
Estriol	0.3	1	91
Estrone sulfate	0	0	99
17β-Dihydroequilin	30	?	?
Equilin	8	26	13
17β-Dihydroequilin sulfate	0	?	?
Equilin sulfate	0	?	?
Δ^{8}-Estrone	?	?	?
The reference ligand (100%) for the SHBG RBA (%) values was testosterone.

== Endogenous steroids ==
=== Measurement ===
When checking serum estradiol or testosterone, a total level that includes free and bound fractions can be assayed, or the free portion may be measured alone. Sex hormone-binding globulin can be measured separately from the total fraction of testosterone.

A free androgen index expresses the ratio of testosterone to SHBG and can be used to summarize the activity of free testosterone.

=== Affinity and binding ===
Affinities of endogenous steroids for SHBG and plasma protein binding
Steroid	SHBG affinity		Plasma protein binding in men					Plasma protein binding in women (follicular phase)				
Steroid	RBA (%)	K (10^{6} M^{−1})	Total (nM)	Unbound (%)	SHBG (%)	CBG (%)	Albumin (%)	Total (nM)	Unbound (%)	SHBG (%)	CBG (%)	Albumin (%)
Aldosterone	0.017	0.21	0.35	37.1	0.10	21.2	41.6	0.24	36.8	0.23	21.9	41.2
3α-Androstanediol	82	1300	0.41	0.85	13.7	<0.1	85.5	0.068	0.71	27.9	<0.1	71.4
Androstenediol	97	1500	4.3	3.24	60.4	<0.1	36.3	2.4	1.73	78.8	<0.1	19.4
Androstenedione	2.3	29	4.1	7.85	2.82	1.37	88.0	5.4	7.54	6.63	1.37	84.5
Androsterone	1.1	14	2.0	4.22	0.73	0.52	94.5	1.5	4.18	1.77	0.54	93.5
Corticosterone	0.18	2.2	12	3.39	0.09	77.5	19.0	7.0	3.28	0.22	78.1	18.4
Cortisol	0.13	1.6	400	3.91	0.08	89.5	6.57	400	3.77	0.18	89.7	6.33
Cortisone	0.22	2.7	72	16.2	0.54	38.0	45.3	54	15.8	1.30	38.6	44.3
Dehydroepiandrosterone	5.3	66	24	4.13	3.38	<0.1	92.4	17	3.93	7.88	<0.1	88.1
11-Deoxycorticosterone	1.9	24	0.20	2.69	0.80	36.4	60.1	0.12	2.62	1.91	36.9	58.6
11-Deoxycortisol	1.3	16	1.4	3.37	0.67	77.1	18.9	0.60	3.24	1.57	77.1	18.1
Dihydrotestosterone	220	5500	1.7	0.88	59.7	0.22	39.2	0.65	0.47	78.4	0.12	21.0
Estradiol	49	680	0.084	2.32	19.6	<0.1	78.0	0.29	1.81	37.3	<0.1	60.8
Estriol	0.35	4.3	0.037	8.15	0.44	<0.2	91.3	0.10	8.10	1.06	<0.2	90.7
Estrone	12	150	0.081	3.96	7.37	<0.1	88.6	0.23	3.58	16.3	<0.1	80.1
Etiocholanolone	0.11	1.4	1.3	8.15	0.14	0.44	91.3	1.2	8.13	0.35	0.46	91.1
Pregnenolone	1.1	14	2.4	2.87	0.50	0.16	96.5	2.2	2.85	1.21	0.16	95.8
17α-Hydroxypregnenolone	0.19	2.3	5.4	4.27	0.12	<0.1	95.5	3.5	4.26	0.30	<0.1	95.4
Progesterone	0.71	8.8	0.57	2.39	0.26	17.2	80.1	0.65	2.36	0.63	17.7	79.3
17α-Hydroxyprogesterone	0.8	9.9	5.4	2.50	0.31	41.3	55.9	1.8	2.44	0.73	42.1	54.7
Testosterone	100	1600	23	2.23	44.3	3.56	49.9	1.3	1.36	66.0	2.26	30.4
In men, the concentrations of SHBG, CBG, and albumin were 28 nM, 0.7 μM, and 0.56 mM, respectively. In women, the concentrations of SHBG, CBG, and albumin were 37 nM, 0.7 μM, and 0.56 mM, respectively.

== Synonyms ==
SHBG has been known under a variety of different names including:

- Sex hormone-binding globulin (SHBG)
- Sex steroid-binding globulin (SSBG, SBG)
- Sex steroid-binding protein (SBP, SSBP)
- Androgen-binding protein (ABP)
- Estradiol-binding-protein (EBP)
- Testosterone–estradiol binding globulin (TeBG, TEBG)
