= C26H28ClNO =

The molecular formula C_{26}H_{28}ClNO (molar mass: 405.96 g/mol, exact mass: 405.1859 u) may refer to:

- Clomifene, or clomiphene
- Enclomifene, or enclomiphene
- Toremifene
- Zuclomifene, or zuclomiphene
