= Finerenone =

Chemical compound

- Molecular structure of finerenone

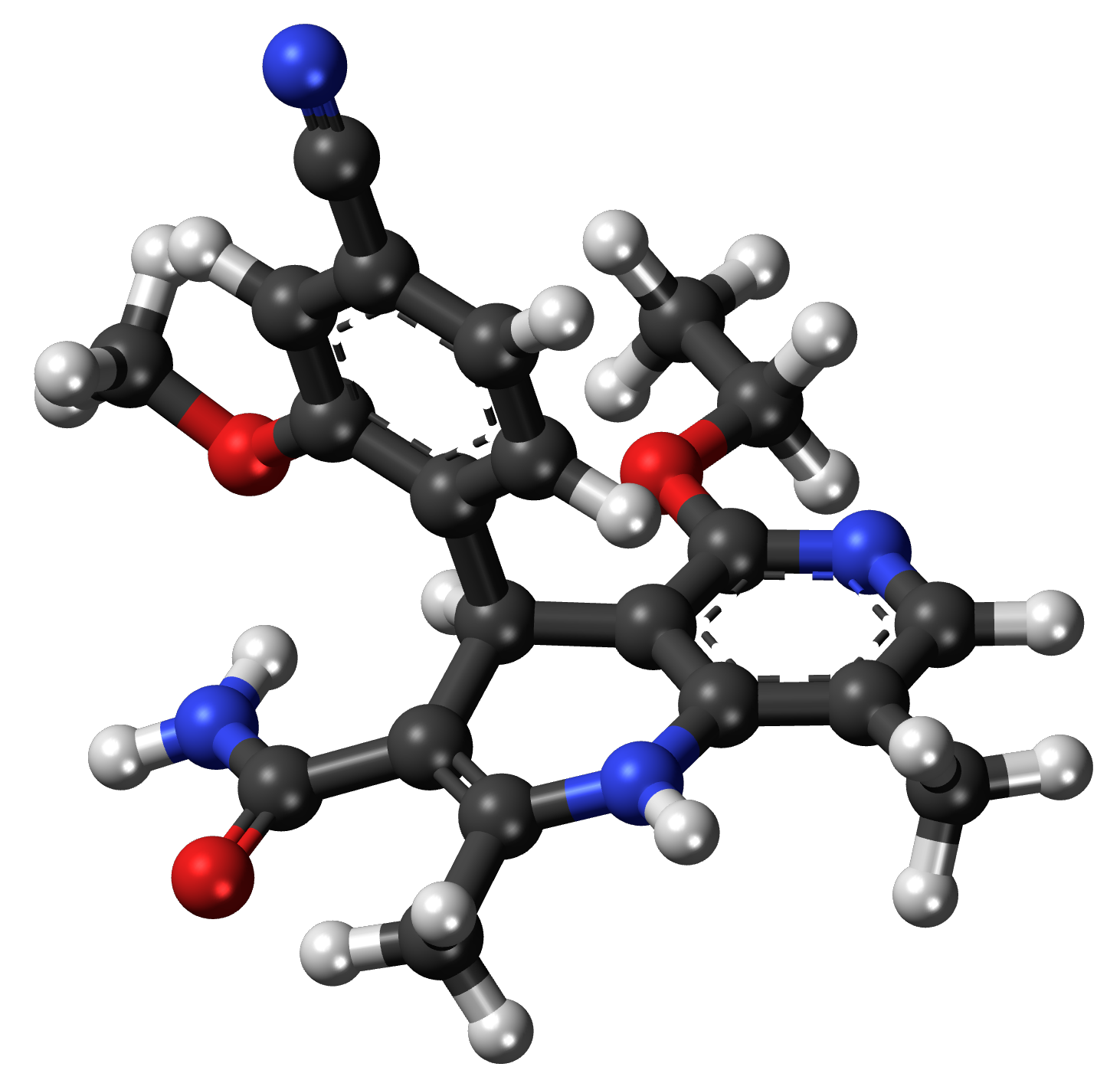
- 3D representation of a finerenone molecule

Clinical data
- Trade names: Kerendia
- Other names: BAY 94-8862
- AHFS/Drugs.com: Monograph
- MedlinePlus: a621038
- License data: US DailyMed: Finerenone
- Pregnancy category: AU: D
- Routes of administration: Oral
- Drug class: Potassium-sparing diuretic
- ATC code: C03DA05 (WHO)

Legal status
- Legal status: AU: S4 (Prescription only); CA: ℞-only; US: ℞-only; EU: Rx-only

Identifiers
- IUPAC name: (4S)-4-(4-Cyano-2-methoxyphenyl)-5-ethoxy-2,8-dimethyl-1,4-dihydro-1,6-naphthyridine-3-carboxamide
- CAS Number: 1050477-31-0
- PubChem CID: 60150535
- DrugBank: DB16165
- ChemSpider: 28669387
- UNII: DE2O63YV8R
- KEGG: D10633
- ChEMBL: ChEMBL2181927
- CompTox Dashboard (EPA): DTXSID10146928
- ECHA InfoCard: 100.247.614

Chemical and physical data
- Formula: C_{21}H_{22}N_{4}O_{3}
- Molar mass: 378.432 g·mol^{−1}
- 3D model (JSmol): Interactive image
- SMILES: NC(=O)C1=C(C)Nc2c(C)cnc(OCC)c2[C@@H]1c3ccc(C#N)cc3OC
- InChI: InChI=1S/C21H22N4O3/c1-5-28-21-18-17(14-7-6-13(9-22)8-15(14)27-4)16(20(23)26)12(3)25-19(18)11(2)10-24-21/h6-8,10,17,25H,5H2,1-4H3,(H2,23,26)/t17-/m1/s1; Key:BTBHLEZXCOBLCY-QGZVFWFLSA-N

Finerenone, marketed under the brand name Kerendia among others, is a medication used to reduce the risk of kidney function decline, kidney failure, cardiovascular death, non-fatal myocardial infarctions, and hospitalization for heart failure in adults with chronic kidney disease associated with type 1 diabetes and type 2 diabetes. In the United States, it is also approved to reduce the risk of cardiovascular death, hospitalization for heart failure, and urgent heart failure visits in adults with heart failure and a left ventricular ejection fraction (LVEF) of 40% or greater. Finerenone is a non-steroidal mineralocorticoid receptor antagonist. It is taken orally (swallowed by mouth).

Common side effects include abnormally high levels of potassium in the bloodstream, abnormally low levels of sodium in the bloodstream, and abnormally low blood pressure.

Finerenone was approved for medical use in the United States in July 2021, and in the European Union in February 2022. The US Food and Drug Administration considers it to be a first-in-class medication.

== Medical uses ==
In the United States, finerenone is indicated to reduce the risk of kidney function decline, kidney failure, cardiovascular death, non-fatal heart attacks, and hospitalization for heart failure in adults with chronic kidney disease associated with type 1 and type 2 diabetes.

In the European Union, finerenone is indicated for the treatment of chronic kidney disease associated with type 2 diabetes in adults.

== Pharmacology ==
Finerenone has less relative affinity to other steroid hormone receptors than currently available aldosterone antagonists such as eplerenone and spironolactone, which should result in fewer adverse effects like gynaecomastia, impotence, and low libido.

This table compares inhibitory (blocking) concentrations (IC_{50}, unit: nM) of three antimineralocorticoids. Mineralocorticoid receptor inhibition is responsible for the desired action of the drugs, whereas inhibition of the other receptors potentially leads to side effects. Lower values mean stronger inhibition.

| | Spironolactone | Eplerenone | Finerenone |
|---|---|---|---|
| Mineralocorticoid receptor | 24 | 990 | 18 |
| Glucocorticoid receptor | 2400 | 22,000 | >10,000 |
| Androgen receptor | 77 | 21,200 | >10,000 |
| Progesterone receptor | 740 | 31,200 | >10,000 |

Finerenone acts as an antagonist to mineralocorticoid receptors harboring the S810L mutation (which results in severe hypertension) unlike other traditional inhibitors of mineralocorticoids such as spironolactone and eplerenone that incidentally act as agonists.

A meta-analysis of data from seven randomized controlled trials (13,783 participants) found a benefit to using finerenone in people with diabetic kidney disease and overt proteinuria.

== Adverse effects ==
Finerenone may cause electrolyte imbalances. Symptoms that correlate with higher levels of potassium include nausea, weakness, chest pain, and loss of movement. People with lower levels of sodium may experience headaches, confusion, weakness, and feeling off balance.

== History ==
The efficacy of finerenone to improve kidney and heart outcomes was evaluated in a randomized, multicenter, double-blind, placebo-controlled study in adults with chronic kidney disease associated with type 2 diabetes. In this study, 5,674 participants were randomly assigned to receive either finerenone or a placebo.

The study compared the two groups for the number of participants whose disease progressed to a composite (or combined) endpoint that included at least a 40% reduction in kidney function, progression to kidney failure, or kidney death. Results showed that 504 of the 2,833 participants who received finerenone had at least one of the events in the composite endpoint compared to 600 of the 2,841 participants who received a placebo.

The US Food and Drug Administration (FDA) granted the application for finerenone priority review and fast track designations. The FDA granted the approval of Kerendia to Bayer Healthcare.

== Legal status ==
In December 2021, the Committee for Medicinal Products for Human Use of the European Medicines Agency adopted a positive opinion, recommending the granting of a marketing authorization for the medicinal product Kerendia, intended for the treatment of chronic kidney disease associated with type 2 diabetes in adults. Finerenone was approved for medical use in the European Union in February 2022.

== Brand names ==
Finerenone is sold under the brand names Kerendia and Firialta.

== Research ==
In a phase II study, finerenone reduced urine albumin to creatinine ratio in patients with diabetic kidney disease. Large phase III trials (e.g., FIDELIO-DKD and FIGARO-DKD) have since evaluated finerenone’s effects on renal and cardiovascular outcomes in patients with CKD associated with type 2 diabetes, contributing to regulatory approvals.
