= Ocedurenone =

Chemical compound

Clinical data
- Other names: KBP-5074

Legal status
- Legal status: Investigational

Identifiers
- IUPAC name: 4-[(3S,3aR)-3-Cyclopentyl-7-(4-hydroxypiperidine-1-carbonyl)-3,3a,4,5-tetrahydropyrazolo[3,4-f]quinolin-2-yl]-2-chlorobenzonitrile
- CAS Number: 1359969-24-6
- PubChem CID: 75593324
- UNII: L46509378R

Chemical and physical data
- Formula: C_{28}H_{30}ClN_{5}O_{2}
- Molar mass: 504.03 g·mol^{−1}

Ocedurenone, formerly known as KBP-5074, is a nonsteroidal, selective mineralocorticoid receptor antagonist that is being developed to treat hypertension in patients with chronic kidney disease with less risk of hyperkalemia than existing treatments. In 2023, KPB Biosciences entered into talks to sell the drug to Novo Nordisk for up to USD$1.3 billion. It is a small molecule drug administered orally and is in a Phase III trial that is scheduled to complete in 2024.
