= 7α-Thiomethylspironolactone =

Chemical compound

Clinical data
- Other names: 7α-TMS; SC-26519; 17α-Hydroxy-7α-(methylthio)-3-oxopregn-4-ene-21-carboxylic acid γ-lactone
- Drug class: Antimineralocorticoid

Identifiers
- IUPAC name: (7R,8R,9S,10R,13S,14S,17R)-10,13-dimethyl-7-methylsulfanylspiro[2,6,7,8,9,11,12,14,15,16-decahydro-1H-cyclopenta[a]phenanthrene-17,5'-oxolane]-2',3-dione
- CAS Number: 38753-77-4
- PubChem CID: 162325
- ChemSpider: 142539
- UNII: 0YU66JY4WL
- ChEMBL: ChEMBL3544705
- CompTox Dashboard (EPA): DTXSID80959567

Chemical and physical data
- Formula: C_{23}H_{32}O_{3}S
- Molar mass: 388.57 g·mol^{−1}
- 3D model (JSmol): Interactive image
- SMILES: C[C@]12CCC(=O)C=C1C[C@H]([C@@H]3[C@@H]2CC[C@]4([C@H]3CC[C@@]45CCC(=O)O5)C)SC
- InChI: InChI=1S/C23H32O3S/c1-21-8-4-15(24)12-14(21)13-18(27-3)20-16(21)5-9-22(2)17(20)6-10-23(22)11-7-19(25)26-23/h12,16-18,20H,4-11,13H2,1-3H3/t16-,17-,18+,20+,21-,22-,23+/m0/s1; Key:FWRDLPQBEOKIRE-RJKHXGPOSA-N

7α-Thiomethylspironolactone (7α-TMS; developmental code name SC-26519) is a steroidal antimineralocorticoid and antiandrogen of the spirolactone group and the major active metabolite of spironolactone. Other important metabolites of spironolactone include 7α-thiospironolactone (7α-TS; SC-24813), 6β-hydroxy-7α-thiomethylspironolactone (6β-OH-7α-TMS), and canrenone (SC-9376).

Spironolactone is a prodrug with a short terminal half-life of 1.4 hours. The active metabolites of spironolactone have extended terminal half-lives of 13.8 hours for 7α-TMS, 15.0 hours for 6β-OH-7α-TMS, and 16.5 hours for canrenone, and accordingly, these metabolites are responsible for the therapeutic effects of the drug.

7α-TS and 7α-TMS have been found to possess approximately equivalent affinity for the rat ventral prostate androgen receptor (AR) relative to that of spironolactone. The affinity of 7α-TS, 7α-TMS, and spironolactone for the rat prostate AR is about 3.0 to 8.5% of that of dihydrotestosterone (DHT).

Pharmacokinetics of 100 mg/day spironolactone and its metabolites
Compound	C_{max} (day 1)	C_{max} (day 15)	AUC (day 15)	t_{1/2}
Spironolactone	72 ng/mL (173 nmol/L)	80 ng/mL (192 nmol/L)	231 ng•hour/mL (555 nmol•hour/L)	1.4 hours
Canrenone	155 ng/mL (455 nmol/L)	181 ng/mL (532 nmol/L)	2,173 ng•hour/mL (6,382 nmol•hour/L)	16.5 hours
7α-TMS	359 ng/mL (924 nmol/L)	391 ng/mL (1,006 nmol/L)	2,804 ng•hour/mL (7,216 nmol•hour/L)	13.8 hours
6β-OH-7α-TMS	101 ng/mL (250 nmol/L)	125 ng/mL (309 nmol/L)	1,727 ng•hour/mL (4,269 nmol•hour/L)	15.0 hours
Sources: See template.

7α-TMS has been found to account for around 80% of the potassium-sparing effect of spironolactone, whereas canrenone accounts for the remaining approximate 10 to 25% of the potassium-sparing effect of the drug.

== See also ==
- 7α-Thiomethylspironolactone sulfoxide
- 7α-Thioprogesterone
