= Balcinrenone =

Pharmaceutical

Clinical data
- Other names: AZD9977; AZD-9977

Legal status
- Legal status: Investigational

Identifiers
- IUPAC name: 2-[(3S)-7-Fluoro-4-(3-oxo-4H-1,4-benzoxazine-6-carbonyl)-2,3-dihydro-1,4-benzoxazin-3-yl]-N-methylacetamide
- CAS Number: 1850385-64-6
- PubChem CID: 118599727
- DrugBank: DB15418
- ChemSpider: 75531296
- UNII: 6C9UKZ0CYE
- KEGG: D13184
- ChEMBL: ChEMBL3916929

Chemical and physical data
- Formula: C_{20}H_{18}FN_{3}O_{5}
- Molar mass: 399.378 g·mol^{−1}
- 3D model (JSmol): Interactive image
- SMILES: CNC(=O)C[C@H]1COC2=C(N1C(=O)C3=CC4=C(C=C3)OCC(=O)N4)C=CC(=C2)F
- InChI: InChI=1S/C20H18FN3O5/c1-22-18(25)8-13-9-28-17-7-12(21)3-4-15(17)24(13)20(27)11-2-5-16-14(6-11)23-19(26)10-29-16/h2-7,13H,8-10H2,1H3,(H,22,25)(H,23,26)/t13-/m0/s1; Key:MBKYLPOPYYLTNW-ZDUSSCGKSA-N

Balcinrenone is an experimental selective mineralocorticoid receptor modulator developed by AstraZeneca for heart failure. Compared to mineralocorticoid receptor antagonists, it is hoped to have less effect on electrolytes and therefore a lower risk of hyperkalemia.
