= C22H28O3 =

The molecular formula C_{22}H_{28}O_{3} (molar mass: 340.45 g/mol, exact mass: 340.203845 u) may refer to:

- Canrenone, an aldosterone antagonist
- Norethisterone acetate
