= Canrenoic acid =

Chemical compound

Clinical data
- Other names: 17-Hydroxy-3-oxo-17α-pregna-4,6-diene-21-carboxylic acid
- Drug class: Antimineralocorticoid

Identifiers
- IUPAC name: 3-[(8R,9S,10R,13S,14S,17R)-17-Hydroxy-10,13-dimethyl-3-oxo-2,8,9,11,12,14,15,16-octahydro-1H-cyclopenta[a]phenanthren-17-yl]propanoic acid
- CAS Number: 4138-96-9
- PubChem CID: 656615
- ChemSpider: 570976
- UNII: 87UG89VA9K
- CompTox Dashboard (EPA): DTXSID5022726
- ECHA InfoCard: 100.021.785

Chemical and physical data
- Formula: C_{22}H_{30}O_{4}
- Molar mass: 358.478 g·mol^{−1}
- 3D model (JSmol): Interactive image
- SMILES: C[C@]12CCC(=O)C=C1C=C[C@@H]3[C@@H]2CC[C@]4([C@H]3CC[C@]4(CCC(=O)O)O)C
- InChI: InChI=1S/C22H30O4/c1-20-9-5-15(23)13-14(20)3-4-16-17(20)6-10-21(2)18(16)7-11-22(21,26)12-8-19(24)25/h3-4,13,16-18,26H,5-12H2,1-2H3,(H,24,25)/t16-,17+,18+,20+,21+,22-/m1/s1; Key:PBKZPPIHUVSDNM-WNHSNXHDSA-N

Canrenoic acid is a synthetic steroidal antimineralocorticoid which was never marketed.

== See also ==
- Potassium canrenoate
- Canrenone
