= 7α-Thiomethylspironolactone sulfoxide =

Chemical compound

Clinical data
- Other names: 7α-TMS sulfoxide; 7α-Thiomethylspironolactone S-oxide; 7α-Methylsulfinylspironolactone

Identifiers
- IUPAC name: (7R,8R,9S,10R,13S,14S,17R)-10,13-dimethyl-7-methylsulfinylspiro[2,6,7,8,9,11,12,14,15,16-decahydro-1H-cyclopenta[a]phenanthrene-17,5'-oxolane]-2',3-dione
- CAS Number: 38753-75-2
- PubChem CID: 162324
- ChemSpider: 142538
- UNII: 59MB937W7X
- ChEMBL: ChEMBL3544706
- CompTox Dashboard (EPA): DTXSID60959565

Chemical and physical data
- Formula: C_{23}H_{32}O_{4}S
- Molar mass: 404.57 g·mol^{−1}
- 3D model (JSmol): Interactive image
- SMILES: C[C@]12CCC(=O)C=C1C[C@H]([C@@H]3[C@@H]2CC[C@]4([C@H]3CC[C@@]45CCC(=O)O5)C)S(=O)C
- InChI: InChI=1S/C23H32O4S/c1-21-8-4-15(24)12-14(21)13-18(28(3)26)20-16(21)5-9-22(2)17(20)6-10-23(22)11-7-19(25)27-23/h12,16-18,20H,4-11,13H2,1-3H3/t16-,17-,18+,20+,21-,22-,23+,28?/m0/s1; Key:ADVFYBFTUKGFGC-FLWPULIFSA-N

7α-Thiomethylspironolactone sulfoxide (also known as 7α-TMS sulfoxide, 7α-thiomethylspironolactone S-oxide, or 7α-methylsulfinylspironolactone) is a metabolite of spironolactone (brand name Aldactone), an antimineralocorticoid and antiandrogen medication. 7α-TMS sulfoxide is specifically formed from 7α-thiomethylspironolactone (7α-TMS).
