= Kaliuresis =

Excretion of potassium in human urine

Kaliuresis (/ˌkeɪlijʊəˈriːsɪs, ˌkæli-/) or kaluresis (/ˌkeɪl(j)ʊəˈriːsɪs, ˌkæl-/) is the condition of excreting potassium in the urine.

Thiazide diuretics are used to treat patients with heart failure. Their goal is to decrease the amount of salt (sodium chloride) in the body by decreasing the amount that the kidney reabsorbs. This excess sodium in the kidneys that is destined for excretion via urination can cause hyponatremia (low sodium level) and can lead to kaliuresis by increasing sodium-potassium exchange.

== See also ==
- Natriuresis
- Antikaliuretic
