= 6β-Hydroxy-7α-thiomethylspironolactone =

Chemical compound

Clinical data
- Other names: 6β-OH-7α-TMS; 6β,17α-Dihydroxy-7α-(methylthio)-3-oxo-pregn-4-ene-21-carboxylic acid γ-lactone
- Drug class: Antimineralocorticoid

Identifiers
- IUPAC name: (6S,7S,8R,10R,13S,14S,17R)-6-hydroxy-10,13-dimethyl-7-methylsulfanylspiro[2,6,7,8,9,11,12,14,15,16-decahydro-1H-cyclopenta[a]phenanthrene-17,5'-oxolane]-2',3-dione
- CAS Number: 42219-60-3
- PubChem CID: 162502
- ChemSpider: 32820916
- UNII: 4A93WO4Z3G

Chemical and physical data
- Formula: C_{23}H_{32}O_{4}S
- Molar mass: 404.57 g·mol^{−1}
- 3D model (JSmol): Interactive image
- SMILES: CS[C@@H]1[C@@H](O)C2=CC(=O)CC[C@]2(C)[C@H]3CC[C@@]4(C)[C@@H](CC[C@@]45CCC(=O)O5)[C@H]13
- InChI: InChI=1S/C23H32O4S/c1-21-8-4-13(24)12-16(21)19(26)20(28-3)18-14(21)5-9-22(2)15(18)6-10-23(22)11-7-17(25)27-23/h12,14-15,18-20,26H,4-11H2,1-3H3/t14-,15-,18+,19-,20-,21+,22-,23+/m0/s1; Key:NWLBSWATTSRBOV-DFSNYPBXSA-N

6β-Hydroxy-7α-thiomethylspironolactone (6β-OH-7α-TMS) is a steroidal antimineralocorticoid of the spirolactone group and a major active metabolite of spironolactone. Other important metabolites of spironolactone include 7α-thiospironolactone (7α-TS; SC-24813), 7α-thiomethylspironolactone (7α-TMS; SC-26519), and canrenone (SC-9376).

Spironolactone is a prodrug with a short terminal half-life of 1.4 hours. The active metabolites of spironolactone have extended terminal half-lives of 13.8 hours for 7α-TMS, 15.0 hours for 6β-OH-7α-TMS, and 16.5 hours for canrenone, and accordingly, these metabolites are responsible for the therapeutic effects of the drug.

Pharmacokinetics of 100 mg/day spironolactone and its metabolites
Compound	C_{max} (day 1)	C_{max} (day 15)	AUC (day 15)	t_{1/2}
Spironolactone	72 ng/mL (173 nmol/L)	80 ng/mL (192 nmol/L)	231 ng•hour/mL (555 nmol•hour/L)	1.4 hours
Canrenone	155 ng/mL (455 nmol/L)	181 ng/mL (532 nmol/L)	2,173 ng•hour/mL (6,382 nmol•hour/L)	16.5 hours
7α-TMS	359 ng/mL (924 nmol/L)	391 ng/mL (1,006 nmol/L)	2,804 ng•hour/mL (7,216 nmol•hour/L)	13.8 hours
6β-OH-7α-TMS	101 ng/mL (250 nmol/L)	125 ng/mL (309 nmol/L)	1,727 ng•hour/mL (4,269 nmol•hour/L)	15.0 hours
Sources: See template.

6β-Hydroxytestosterone, which is analogous to 6β-OH-7α-TMS, has been found to possess virtually no androgenicity.

== See also ==
- 7α-Thioprogesterone
