= FAI =

FAI may refer to:

== Arts and entertainment ==
- Festival de Afrobeat Independiente, an afrobeat festival in Buenos Aires
- Fai D. Flowright, a fictional character from Tsubasa: Reservoir Chronicle
- Fai, a character in the anime series Endro!

== Organizations ==
- Food Allergy Initiative, a former American food allergen research organization
- FAI Films, a defunct Australian film production company
- FAI Insurance, former Australian insurance company
- FAI rent-a-jet, a German airline
- Fondo per l'Ambiente Italiano, the Italian National Trust, an Italian environmental organization
- Forschungs- und Arbeitsgemeinschaft Irland e.V., a German society for Irish philately

=== Politics ===
- Broad Left Front (Peru) (Spanish: Frente Amplio de Izquierda), a political coalition in Peru
- Federación Anarquista Ibérica, the Iberian Anarchist Federation
- Informal Anarchist Federation (Italian: Federazione Anarchica Informale), an insurrectionary anarchist organization
- Italian Anarchist Federation (Italian: Federazione Anarchica Italiana)

=== Sport ===
- Fédération Aéronautique Internationale, the world governing body for air sports; it also stewards definitions regarding human spaceflight
- Football Association of Ireland, the governing body for association football in the Republic of Ireland
- Futsal Association of India, the governing body of state-level futsal

== Science and technology ==
- Field-aligned irregularity
- Feel-status minus actual-status inconsistency index, a measurement used to study body image
- Femoroacetabular impingement, a hip joint condition
- First article inspection, a production validation process
- Free androgen index, a ratio used to determine abnormal androgen status in humans
- Friendly artificial intelligence
- Fully Automatic Installation, Linux distribution automation software

== People ==
- Collins Fai (born 1992), Cameroonian footballer
- George Fai (born 1996), Australian rugby league footballer
- Sonny Fai (1988–2009), New Zealand rugby league player

== Other uses ==
- FAI armoured car, a Soviet military vehicle of the early 1930s
- Fairbanks International Airport, in Alaska, US
- Faiwol language (ISO 639-3 code: fai), spoken in Papua New Guinea
- Fatal accident inquiry, in Scotland
