= 7α-Thioprogesterone =

Chemical compound

Clinical data
- Other names: 7α-TP4; SC-8365; 7α-Mercaptopregn-4-ene-3,20-dione

Identifiers
- IUPAC name: (1S,3aS,3bS,4R,9aR,9bS,11aS)-1-Acetyl-9a,11a-dimethyl-4-sulfanyl-1H,2H,3H,3aH,3bH,4H,5H,7H,8H,9H,9aH,9bH,10H,11H,11aH-cyclopenta[a]phenanthren-7-one
- CAS Number: 95286-04-7 67810-32-6 (propionate)

Chemical and physical data
- Formula: C_{21}H_{28}O_{2}S
- Molar mass: 344.51 g·mol^{−1}
- 3D model (JSmol): Interactive image
- SMILES: O=C(C)[C@]1CC[C@]([H])2[C@@]([H])3[C@](S[H])CC4=CC(CC[C@]4(C)[C@@]3([H])CC[C@@]21C)=O
- InChI: InChI=1S/C21H28O2S/c1-12(22)15-4-5-16-19-17(7-9-21(15,16)3)20(2)8-6-14(23)10-13(20)11-18(19)24/h10,16-17,19,24H,4-9,11H2,1-3H3/t16-,17-,19-,20-,21+/m0/s1; Key:MTDUGSYXIPHNBV-JZTRKIHISA-N

7α-Thioprogesterone (7α-TP4; developmental code name SC-8365; also known as 7α-mercaptopregn-4-ene-3,20-dione) is a synthetic, steroidal, and potent antimineralocorticoid (putative) and antiandrogen which was developed by G. D. Searle & Co and was described in the late 1970s and early 1980s but was never developed or introduced for medical use. It is a derivative of progesterone (pregn-4-ene-3,20-dione) with a thio (sulfur) substitution at the C7α position, and is related to the spirolactone group of drugs but lacks a γ-lactone ring.

As an antiandrogen, 7α-TP4 has approximately 8.5% of the affinity of dihydrotestosterone (DHT) for the rat ventral prostate androgen receptor (AR), which is similar to that of spironolactone and its active metabolite 7α-thiomethylspironolactone. The drug has also been assessed at steroid hormone-associated carrier proteins, and shows very low binding to sex hormone-binding globulin (SHBG) but high affinity for corticosteroid-binding globulin (CBG) approximately equal to that of progesterone.

7α-Acetylthio-17α-hydroxyprogesterone, a related derivative of progesterone and also of 17α-hydroxyprogesterone, has been found to possess potent antimineralocorticoid activity similarly. Spironolactone is the derivative of this compound in which the acetyl group at the C17β position has been cyclized with the C17α hydroxyl group to form a spiro 21-carboxylic acid γ-lactone ring.
