= Free androgen index =

Ratio used to determine abnormal androgen status

Free Androgen Index (FAI) is a ratio used to determine abnormal androgen status in humans. The ratio is the total testosterone level divided by the sex hormone binding globulin (SHBG) level, and then multiplying by a constant, usually 100. The concentrations of testosterone and SHBG are normally measured in nanomols per liter. FAI has no unit.

$\text{FAI} = 100 \times \left(\frac{\text{total testosterone}}{\text{SHBG}}\right)$

The majority of testosterone in the blood does not exist as the free molecule. Instead around half is tightly bound to sex hormone binding globulin, and the other half is weakly bound to albumin. Only a small percentage is unbound, under 3% in males, and less than 0.7% in females. Since only the free testosterone is able to bind to tissue receptors to exert its effects, it is believed that free testosterone is the best marker of a person's androgen status. However, free testosterone is difficult and expensive to measure (it requires a time-consuming dialysis step), and many laboratories do not offer this service.

The free androgen index is intended to give a guide to the free testosterone level, but it is not very accurate (especially in males — see endocrine society commentary below). Consequently, there are no universally agreed 'normal ranges', and levels slightly above or below quoted laboratory reference ranges may not be clinically significant.

Reference ranges depend on the constant in the calculation - 100 is used in the formula above, and the following suggested ranges are based on this. As with any laboratory measurement, however, it is vital that results are compared against the reference range quoted for that laboratory. Neither FAI nor free or total testosterone measurements should be interpreted in isolation; as a bare minimum, gonadotropin levels should also be measured.

As a guide, in healthy adult men typical FAI values are 30-150. Values below 30 may indicate testosterone deficiency, which may contribute to fatigue, erectile dysfunction, osteoporosis and loss of secondary sex characteristics. In women, androgens are most often measured when there is concern that they may be raised (as in hirsutism or polyendocrine metabolic ovarian syndrome (PMOS)). Normal values for the FAI in women are 5 or lower.

== Testing ==
Various companies manufacture testing equipment and kits to measure this index. To test about 1 mL of blood is required.

== Usefulness as a biochemical marker ==
=== Validity as a measure of free testosterone ===
Statistical analysis has shown FAI to be a poor predictor of bioavailable testosterone and of hypogonadism in men.

The Endocrine Society has taken a position against using the FAI to measure Free Testosterone in men:

The FAI is often used as a surrogate for FT, and the FAI correlates well with FT in women but not men. Because T production is regulated by gonadotropin feedback in men, changes in SHBG, which alter FT concentrations, will be compensated by autoregulation of T production but not so in women. In addition, much circulating T in women is derived from the peripheral conversion of adrenal dehydroepiandrosterone and dehydroepiandrosterone sulfate that also is not subject to feedback control. Because SHBG is present in such large excess in women (10–100:1), FT concentrations are driven primarily by SHBG abundance. In addition, T excess in women lowers SHBG concentrations, which raises the FT concentration and contributes to the strong correlation of 1/SHBG with FT.

The FAI has not been scientifically demonstrated to be a valid measurement of free testosterone in men:

The Free Androgen Index (FAI) was initially proposed as a measure for assessing the circulating testosterone availability in female hirsutism. The extension of its use, by a number of investigators, to males has not been formally justified.

=== Role in identifying polyendocrine metabolic ovarian syndrome ===
The best single biochemical marker for polyendocrine metabolic ovarian syndrome (PMOS) (formerly known as polycystic ovary syndrome, or PCOS) is a raised testosterone level, but "combination of SHBG and testosterone to derive a free testosterone value did not further aid the biochemical diagnosis of PCOS". Instead SHBG is reduced in obesity and so the FAI seems more correlated with the degree of obesity than with PMOS itself.
