= French-American School =

French-American School, or a variation in English or French, may refer to one of several schools in the United States that provide a French and American education:

- L'École Française du Maine, Freeport, Maine
- The French American International School (Portland, Oregon) in Portland, Oregon
- The French American International School (San Francisco) in San Francisco, California
- The French-American School of New York, New York
- French-American School of Rhode Island
- The French Immersion School of Washington, Bellevue, Washington
- The Lycée International de Los Angeles, California
- The French American School of Tampa Bay in St Petersburg, Florida
