= Enclomifene =

Chemical compound

Clinical data
- Trade names: Androxal; EnCyzix
- Other names: Enclomiphene; (E)-Clomifene; RMI-16289; Enclomid; Enclomifene citrate; Enclomiphene citrate
- Routes of administration: By mouth
- Drug class: Selective estrogen receptor modulator; Progonadotropin

Pharmacokinetic data
- Metabolism: liver, CYP2D6 and CYP3A4
- Elimination half-life: 10 hours

Identifiers
- IUPAC name: 2-[4-[(E)-2-chloro-1,2-diphenylethenyl]phenoxy]-N,N-diethylethanamine
- CAS Number: 15690-57-0
- PubChem CID: 1548953
- IUPHAR/BPS: 7619
- DrugBank: DB06735
- ChemSpider: 1265967
- UNII: R6D2UI4FLS
- KEGG: D10876
- ChEBI: CHEBI:3752
- ChEMBL: ChEMBL954
- CompTox Dashboard (EPA): DTXSID201318048

Chemical and physical data
- Formula: C_{26}H_{28}ClNO
- Molar mass: 405.97 g·mol^{−1}
- 3D model (JSmol): Interactive image
- SMILES: CCN(CC)CCOC1=CC=C(C=C1)/C(=C(\C2=CC=CC=C2)/Cl)/C3=CC=CC=C3
- InChI: InChI=1S/C26H28ClNO/c1-3-28(4-2)19-20-29-24-17-15-22(16-18-24)25(21-11-7-5-8-12-21)26(27)23-13-9-6-10-14-23/h5-18H,3-4,19-20H2,1-2H3/b26-25+; Key:GKIRPKYJQBWNGO-OCEACIFDSA-N

Enclomifene (INN), or enclomiphene (USAN), a nonsteroidal selective estrogen receptor modulator of the triphenylethylene group, acts by antagonizing the estrogen receptor (ER) in the pituitary gland, which reduces negative feedback by estrogen on the hypothalamic-pituitary-gonadal axis, thereby increasing gonadotropin secretion and hence gonadal production of testosterone. It is one of the two stereoisomers of clomifene, which itself is a mixture of 38% zuclomifene and 62% enclomifene. Enclomifene is the (E)-stereoisomer of clomifene, while zuclomifene is the (Z)-stereoisomer. Whereas zuclomifene is more estrogenic, enclomifene is more antiestrogenic. In accordance, unlike enclomifene, zuclomifene is antigonadotropic due to activation of the ER and reduces testosterone levels in men. As such, isomerically pure enclomifene is more favorable than clomifene as a progonadotropin for the treatment of male hypogonadism.

Enclomiphene (former tentative brand names Androxal and EnCyzix), was under development for the treatment of male hypogonadism and type 2 diabetes. By December 2016, it was in preregistration and was under review by the Food and Drug Administration in the United States and the European Medicines Agency in the European Union. In January 2018, the Committee for Medicinal Products for Human Use of the European Medicines Agency recommended refusal of marketing authorization for enclomifene for the treatment of secondary hypogonadism. In April 2021, development of enclomifene was discontinued for all indications.

== Medical uses ==
Enclomiphene is primarily used as a treatment for men with persistent low testosterone as a result of secondary hypogonadotropic hypogonadism. In secondary hypogonadotropic hypogonadism, the resulting low levels of testosterone is attributed to inadequacies in the hypothalamic-pituitary-gonadal axis. In contrast, primary hypogonadism is caused by defects in the testes that causes them to be unable to produce the required amount of testosterone.

Enclomiphene, which stimulates the endogenous production of testosterone, is not currently known to have common adverse effects of exogenous testosterone replacement therapy, such as reduced spermatogenesis or infertility.

== Contraindications ==
Enclomiphene citrate is contraindicated in the groups of individuals below:

- Pregnant women.
- Breastfeeding women.
- Women with unexplained uterine bleeding.
- Women with ovarian growths or cysts unrelated to polyendocrine metabolic ovarian syndrome (PMOS).
- Patients with a history of liver disease.
- Patients with uncontrolled adrenal or thyroid dysfunction.
- Patient with known allergy to enclomiphene or clomiphene.

== Adverse effects ==
The adverse effects of enclomiphene have not been extensively studied. Enclomiphene is a selective estrogen receptor modulator (SERM), which is associated with an increased risk of thrombo-embolic events. Enclomiphene, unlike testosterone replacement therapy, is not associated with infertility or decreased spermatogenesis.

The following adverse events were observed in a population of 1,403 persons participating in phase 2 and phase 3 studies of enclomiphene:

Adverse Event	Frequency % (N)
Headache	1.6% (23)
Hot flush	1.1% (16)
Nausea	1.0% (14)
Muscle spasms	0.9% (12)
Dizziness	0.7% (10)
Fatigue	0.6% (9)
Hematocrit increased	0.6% (9)
Erectile dysfunction	0.6% (8)
PSA increased	0.6% (8)
Increased appetite	0.6% (8)
Vision blurred	0.5% (7)
Aggression	0.5% (7)
Irritability	0.5% (7)
Acne	0.5% (7)
Deep vein thrombosis	0.2% (3)
Pulmonary embolism	0.1% (1)
Ischemic stroke (fatal)	0.1% (1)

== Mechanism of action ==
Enclomiphene is a selective estrogen receptor antagonist, antagonizing the estrogen receptors in the pituitary gland, disrupting the negative feedback loop by estrogen towards the hypothalamic-pituitary-gonadal axis, ultimately resulting in an increase in gonadotropin secretion.

In men with secondary hypogonadotropic hypogonadism, this improves testosterone levels and sperm motility. Men with secondary hypogonadotropic hypogonadism have abnormally low testosterone levels due to low-normal levels of luteinizing hormone (LH) and follicle-stimulating hormone (FSH). The biological role of these hormones is to stimulate the endogenous production of testosterone by the testes.

Common symptoms of secondary hypogonadotropic hypogonadism include low libido, energy, and mood. In addition, men with low testosterone may experience osteoporosis, an increase in visceral fat, and the regression of secondary sexual characteristics. Enclomiphene stimulates the endogenous production of testosterone. It works differently from traditional testosterone replacement therapy, which replaces testosterone using an exogenous source.

In addition, research has uncovered that enclomiphene increases total and free testosterone levels without increasing dihydrotestosterone disproportionately, suggesting that it "normalizes endogenous testosterone production pathways and restores normal testosterone levels in men with secondary hypogonadism."

== History ==
Enclomifene or Enclomiphene (former tentative brand names Androxal and EnCyzix), was under development for the treatment of male hypogonadism and type 2 diabetes. By December 2016, it was in preregistration and was under review by the Food and Drug Administration in the United States and the European Medicines Agency in the European Union. In January 2018, the Committee for Medicinal Products for Human Use of the European Medicines Agency recommended refusal of marketing authorization for enclomifene for the treatment of secondary hypogonadism. In April 2021, development of enclomifene was discontinued for all indications.

Clomiphene citrate, which enclomiphene citrate is derived from, is a drug approved by the Food and Drug Administration (FDA) for indications of anovulatory or oligo-ovulatory infertility and male infertility (spermatogenesis induction).

A media release by the FDA for the pharmacy compounding advisory committee compared the efficacy of testosterone replacement therapy against enclomiphene. They wrote that while testosterone replacement therapy often resulted in side effects such as transference risk, supranormal testosterone levels, suppressed spermatogenesis, suppressed testicular function, and testicular atrophy, none of these risks are present in enclomiphene.

In 2009, a study discovered that "short-term clinical safety data for enclomiphene have been satisfactory and equivalent to safety data for testosterone gels and placebo."

In 2016, a study on enclomiphene citrate reported that "the ability [of enclomiphene citrate] to treat testosterone deficiency in men while maintaining fertility supports a role for enclomiphene citrate in the treatment of men in whom testosterone therapy is not a suitable option."

In 2019, a study was published that found that "enclomiphene has been shown to increase testosterone levels while stimulating [follicular-stimulating hormone] and [luteinizing hormone] production."

The key difference between enclomiphene citrate and traditional testosterone replacement therapy is that enclomiphene citrate stimulates the body to produce its own testosterone, while traditional testosterone replacement therapy replaces low testosterone levels in men with exogenous, synthetic testosterone.

A study conducted in 2013 offered this assessment of the potential of enclomiphene citrate to increase sexual function in men: "If enclomiphene citrate can correct the central defect in men that blocks their ability to produce [lutenizing hormone] and [follicular-stimulating hormone] and thus to produce both testosterone and sperm in the testes, this drug may prove itself superior to other treatments."
