= Potassium canrenoate =

Pharmaceutical drug

Clinical data
- Other names: SC-14266
- AHFS/Drugs.com: International Drug Names
- Routes of administration: Intravenous
- ATC code: C03DA02 (WHO)

Pharmacokinetic data
- Metabolism: Hepatic
- Excretion: Renal and fecal

Identifiers
- IUPAC name: potassium 3-[(8R,9S,10R,13S,14S,17R)- 17-hydroxy-10,13-dimethyl-3-oxo-2,8,9, 11,12,14,15,16-octahydro-1H-cyclopenta[a] phenanthren-17-yl]propanoate
- CAS Number: 2181-04-6
- PubChem CID: 23671691
- DrugBank: DB09015
- ChemSpider: 570975
- UNII: M671F9NLEA
- ChEMBL: ChEMBL1371200
- CompTox Dashboard (EPA): DTXSID2045602
- ECHA InfoCard: 100.016.868

Chemical and physical data
- Formula: C_{22}H_{29}KO_{4}
- Molar mass: 396.568 g·mol^{−1}
- 3D model (JSmol): Interactive image
- SMILES: [K+].[O-]C(=O)CC[C@]3(O)CC[C@H]2[C@@H]4/C=C\C1=C\C(=O)CC[C@@]1([C@H]4CC[C@@]23C)C
- InChI: InChI=1S/C22H30O4.K/c1-20-9-5-15(23)13-14(20)3-4-16-17(20)6-10-21(2)18(16)7-11-22(21,26)12-8-19(24)25;/h3-4,13,16-18,26H,5-12H2,1-2H3,(H,24,25);/q;+1/p-1/t16-,17+,18+,20+,21+,22-;/m1./s1; Key:JTZQCHFUGHIPDF-RYVBEKKQSA-M

Potassium canrenoate (INN, JAN) or canrenoate potassium (USAN) (brand names Venactone, Soldactone), also known as aldadiene kalium, the potassium salt of canrenoic acid, is an aldosterone antagonist of the spirolactone group. Like spironolactone, it is a prodrug, and is metabolized to active canrenone in the body.

Potassium canrenoate is notable in that it is the only clinically used antimineralocorticoid which is available for parenteral administration (specifically intravenous) as opposed to oral administration.

In the UK, it is unlicensed and only used for short term diuresis in oedema or heart failure in neonates or children under specialist initiation and monitoring.

== See also ==
- Canrenoic acid
- Canrenone
