= Eplerenone =

Chemical compound

Clinical data
- Pronunciation: /ɛpˈlɛrənoʊn/
- Trade names: Inspra, others
- Other names: SC-66110; CGP-30083; 9-11α-Epoxymexrenone; 9,11α-Epoxy-7α-methoxycarbonyl-3-oxo-17α-pregn-4-ene-21,17-carbolactone
- AHFS/Drugs.com: Monograph
- MedlinePlus: a603004
- License data: US DailyMed: Eplerenone
- Pregnancy category: AU: B3
- Routes of administration: By mouth
- ATC code: C03DA04 (WHO) C03DA54 (WHO)

Legal status
- Legal status: AU: S4 (Prescription only); US: ℞-only

Pharmacokinetic data
- Bioavailability: ~70%
- Protein binding: ~50% (33–60%) (primarily to α_{1}-acid glycoprotein)
- Metabolism: Liver (CYP3A4)
- Metabolites: 6β-OH-EPL, 6β,21-OH-EPL, 21-OH-EPL, 3α,6β-OH-EPL (All inactive)
- Elimination half-life: 4–6 hours
- Excretion: Urine (67%), feces (32%)

Identifiers
- IUPAC name: methyl (4aS,4bR,5aR,6aS,7R,9aS,9bR,10R)-4a,6a-dimethyl-2,5'-dioxo-2,4,4',4a,5',5a,6,6a,8,9,9a,9b,10,11-tetradecahydro-3H,3'H-spiro[cyclopenta[7,8]phenanthro[4b,5-b]oxirene-7,2'-furan]-10-carboxylate
- CAS Number: 107724-20-9
- PubChem CID: 5282131
- IUPHAR/BPS: 2876
- DrugBank: DB00700
- ChemSpider: 10203511
- UNII: 6995V82D0B
- KEGG: D01115
- ChEBI: CHEBI:31547
- ChEMBL: ChEMBL1095097
- PDB ligand: YNU (PDBe, RCSB PDB)
- CompTox Dashboard (EPA): DTXSID2046094
- ECHA InfoCard: 100.106.615

Chemical and physical data
- Formula: C_{24}H_{30}O_{6}
- Molar mass: 414.498 g·mol^{−1}
- 3D model (JSmol): Interactive image
- SMILES: COC(=O)[C@@H]4C\C1=C\C(=O)CC[C@]1(C)[C@@]65O[C@@H]6C[C@@]3(C)[C@@H](CC[C@]23CCC(=O)O2)[C@H]45
- InChI: InChI=1S/C24H30O6/c1-21-7-4-14(25)10-13(21)11-15(20(27)28-3)19-16-5-8-23(9-6-18(26)30-23)22(16,2)12-17-24(19,21)29-17/h10,15-17,19H,4-9,11-12H2,1-3H3/t15-,16+,17-,19+,21+,22+,23-,24-/m1/s1; Key:JUKPWJGBANNWMW-VWBFHTRKSA-N

Eplerenone, sold under brand name Inspra among others, is an aldosterone antagonist used primarily in the treatment of heart failure with reduced ejection fraction (HFrEF), particularly following myocardial infarction. It may also be considered as an add-on therapy in resistant hypertension; however, the majority of evidence in this setting supports the use of spironolactone (another drug in a same class), with fewer studies directly evaluating eplerenone.

It is also a steroidal antimineralocorticoid of the spirolactone group and a selective aldosterone receptor antagonist (SARA).

== Medical uses ==
=== Heart failure ===
Eplerenone and other mineralocorticoid receptor antagonists have been demonstrated to reduce the risk of death and hospitalisation in patients with heart failure with reduced ejection fraction (HFrEF) who have a left ventricular ejection fraction (LVEF) of 40% or less. It has also been demonstrated to increase LVEF by an average of 4.95%. These benefits are seen when used with other cornerstone heart failure therapies such as an ACE inhibitor or Angiotensin II receptor blocker, beta blocker, and a diuretic .

=== Hypertension ===
Eplerenone lowers blood pressure in patients with primary hypertension. Eplerenone also reduces arterial stiffness and vascular endothelial dysfunction.

For persons with resistant hypertension, eplerenone is safe and effective for reducing blood pressure, particularly in persons with resistant hypertension due to hyperaldosteronism.

=== Central serous chorioretinopathy ===
Eplerenone is often prescribed for people with central serous chorioretinopathy (CSC). However, the most recent and largest randomized controlled trial showed that eplerenone has no significant effect on chronic CSC that has been untreated for four months. There was one relatively large prospective, interventional case-control study that was tested in acute CSC that showed improved resolution of subretinal fluid in treatment group vs observational group (which is standard of care) with 45% resolution at end of 1st month, 55% at end of 2nd month, and 62% at end of 3rd month (vs 10%, 21%, and 31% in standard of care group). Study also showed faster resolution of visual acuity at the end of each month with 92% and 100% in the first two months vs 74% and 86% with resolution reaching 100% after the third month in standard of care group.

== Adverse effects ==
Common adverse drug reactions (ADRs) associated with the use of eplerenone include: hyperkalaemia, hypotension, dizziness, and reduced renal clearance. Eplerenone is associated with a lower incidence of sexual side effects, such as gynecomastia, impotence, and low sex drive, compared to spironolactone, likely due to its more selective action on the aldosterone receptor. This is because other antimineralocorticoids have structural elements of the progesterone molecule, causing progestogenic and antiandrogenic outcomes. These medicines vary in their ability to offset the nongenomic effects of aldosterone.

There is not enough evidence available from the randomized controlled trials on side effects of eplerenone to do a benefit versus risk assessment in people with primary hypertension.

=== Interactions ===
Eplerenone is primarily metabolized by the cytochrome P450 enzyme CYP3A4. Thus the potential exists for adverse drug interactions with other drugs that induce or inhibit CYP3A4. Specifically, the concomitant use of the CYP3A4 potent inhibitors ketoconazole and itraconazole is contraindicated. Other CYP3A4 inhibitors including erythromycin, saquinavir, and verapamil should be used with caution. Other drugs that increase potassium concentrations may increase the risk of hyperkalemia associated with eplerenone therapy, including salt substitutes, potassium supplements and other potassium-sparing diuretics.

== Pharmacology ==
Eplerenone is an antimineralocorticoid, or an antagonist of the mineralocorticoid receptor (MR). Eplerenone is also known chemically as 9,11α-epoxy-7α-methoxycarbonyl-3-oxo-17α-pregn-4-ene-21,17-carbolactone and "was derived from spironolactone by the introduction of a 9α,11α-epoxy bridge and by substitution of the 17α-thoacetyl group of spironolactone with a carbomethoxy group." The drug controls high blood pressure by blocking the binding of aldosterone to the mineralocorticoid receptor (MR) in epithelial tissues, such as the kidney. Blocking the action of aldosterone decreases blood volume and lowers blood pressure. It has 10- to 20-fold lower affinity for the MR relative to spironolactone, and is less potent in vivo as an antimineralocorticoid. However, in contrast to spironolactone, eplerenone has little affinity for the androgen, progesterone, and glucocorticoid receptors. It also has more consistently observed non-genomic antimineralocorticoid effects relative to spironolactone (see membrane mineralocorticoid receptor). Eplerenone differs from spironolactone in its extensive metabolism, with a short half-life and inactive metabolites.

Eplerenone seems to be about 50 to 75% as potent as spironolactone as an antimineralocorticoid. Hence, 25 mg/day spironolactone may be equivalent to approximately 50 mg/day eplerenone.

== Society and culture ==
Eplerenone was patented in 1983 and approved for medical use in the United States in 2002. Eplerenone is approved for sale in Canada, the US, the EU, Netherlands, and Japan.

=== Economics ===
Eplerenone costs an estimated $2.93 per day when treating congestive heart failure and $5.86 per day when treating hypertension.

=== Brand names ===
In the US, Inspra is sold by Viatris after Upjohn was spun off from Pfizer.
