= Canrenone =

Chemical compound

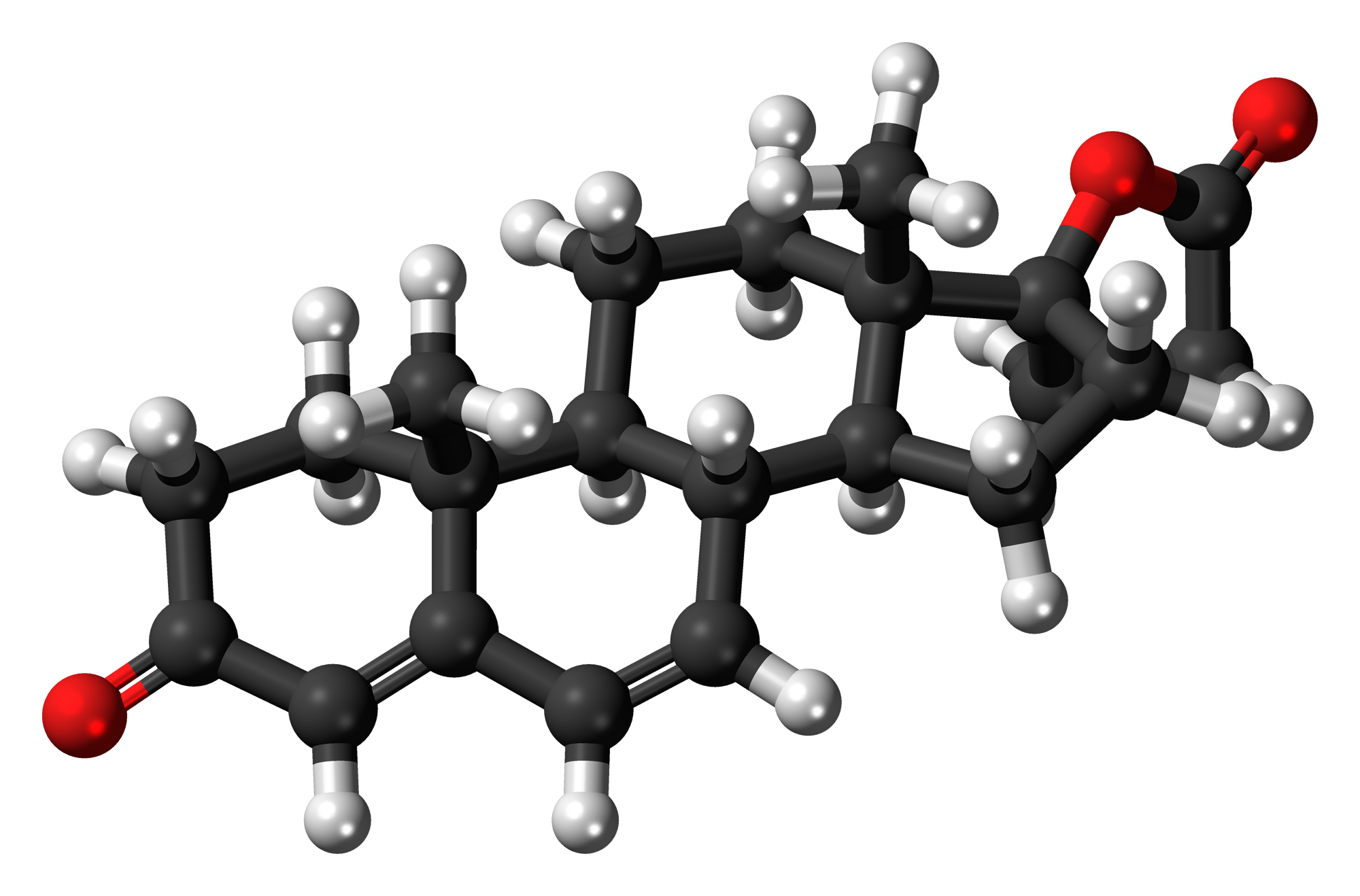

Clinical data
- Trade names: Contaren, Luvion, Phanurane, Spiroletan
- Other names: Aldadiene; SC-9376; RP-11614; 7α-Desthioacetyl-δ^{6}-spironolactone; 6,7-Dehydro-7α-desthioacetylspironolactone; 17-Hydroxy-3-oxo-17α-pregna-4,6-diene-21-carboxylic acid γ-lactone
- AHFS/Drugs.com: International Drug Names
- Drug class: Antimineralocorticoid
- ATC code: C03DA03 (WHO)

Pharmacokinetic data
- Protein binding: 95%
- Elimination half-life: 16.5 hours

Identifiers
- IUPAC name: 10,13-Dimethylspiro[2,8,9,11,12,14,15,16-octahydro-1H-cyclopenta[a]phenanthrene-17,5'-oxolane]-2',3-dione
- CAS Number: 976-71-6
- PubChem CID: 13789
- ChemSpider: 13192
- UNII: 78O20X9J0U
- ChEMBL: ChEMBL1463345
- CompTox Dashboard (EPA): DTXSID3045930
- ECHA InfoCard: 100.012.322

Chemical and physical data
- Formula: C_{22}H_{28}O_{3}
- Molar mass: 340.463 g·mol^{−1}
- 3D model (JSmol): Interactive image
- SMILES: O=C5\C=C4\C=C/[C@@H]1[C@H](CC[C@]3([C@H]1CC[C@]32OC(=O)CC2)C)[C@@]4(C)CC5
- InChI: InChI=1S/C22H28O3/c1-20-9-5-15(23)13-14(20)3-4-16-17(20)6-10-21(2)18(16)7-11-22(21)12-8-19(24)25-22/h3-4,13,16-18H,5-12H2,1-2H3/t16-,17+,18+,20+,21+,22-/m1/s1; Key:UJVLDDZCTMKXJK-WNHSNXHDSA-N

Canrenone, sold under the brand names Contaren, Luvion, Phanurane, and Spiroletan, is a steroidal antimineralocorticoid of the spirolactone group related to spironolactone which is used as a diuretic in Europe, including Italy and Belgium. It is also an important active metabolite of spironolactone, and partially accounts for its therapeutic effects.

== Medical uses ==
Two studies of canrenone in people with heart failure have shown a benefit compared to placebo. In an evaluation of people with chronic heart failure (CHF),

One study compared 166 people treated with canrenone to 336 people given conventional therapy, both for 10 years. Overall, people that were treated with canrenone displayed a lower number of deaths and longer survival compared to the placebo group. Patients treated with canrenone had lower systolic and diastolic blood pressure compared to conventional therapy. Uric acid was lower in the group treated with canrenone, as was left ventricular mass, and a greater progression of NYHA class was observed in the control group compared to patients treated with canrenone. However, no differences were seen in potassium, sodium, and brain natriuretic peptide (BNP) levels.

A separate study concluded that treatment with canrenone, alongside optimal therapy, in patients with chronic heart failure improved diastolic function and further decreased BNP levels.

Canrenone has also been found to be effective in the treatment of hirsutism in women.

== Pharmacology ==
=== Pharmacodynamics ===
Canrenone is reportedly more potent as an antimineralocorticoid relative to spironolactone, but is considerably less potent and effective as an antiandrogen. Similarly to spironolactone, canrenone inhibits steroidogenic enzymes such as 11β-hydroxylase, cholesterol side-chain cleavage enzyme, 17α-hydroxylase, 17,20-lyase, and 21-hydroxylase but is comparatively less potent in doing so.

=== Pharmacokinetics ===
The elimination half-life of canrenone is about 16.5 hours.

=== As a metabolite ===
Canrenone is an active metabolite of spironolactone, canrenoic acid, and potassium canrenoate, and is considered to be partially responsible for their effects. It has been found to have approximately 10 to 25% of the potassium-sparing diuretic effect of spironolactone, whereas another metabolite, 7α-thiomethylspironolactone (7α-TMS), accounts for around 80% of the potassium-sparing effect of the drug.

Pharmacokinetics of 100 mg/day spironolactone and its metabolites
Compound	C_{max} (day 1)	C_{max} (day 15)	AUC (day 15)	t_{1/2}
Spironolactone	72 ng/mL (173 nmol/L)	80 ng/mL (192 nmol/L)	231 ng•hour/mL (555 nmol•hour/L)	1.4 hours
Canrenone	155 ng/mL (455 nmol/L)	181 ng/mL (532 nmol/L)	2,173 ng•hour/mL (6,382 nmol•hour/L)	16.5 hours
7α-TMS	359 ng/mL (924 nmol/L)	391 ng/mL (1,006 nmol/L)	2,804 ng•hour/mL (7,216 nmol•hour/L)	13.8 hours
6β-OH-7α-TMS	101 ng/mL (250 nmol/L)	125 ng/mL (309 nmol/L)	1,727 ng•hour/mL (4,269 nmol•hour/L)	15.0 hours
Sources: See template.

== History ==
Canrenone was described and characterized in 1959. It was introduced for medical use, in the form of potassium canrenoate (the potassium salt of canrenoic acid), in 1968.

== Society and culture ==
=== Generic names ===
Canrenone is the INN and USAN of the drug.

=== Brand names ===
Canrenone has been marketed under the brand names Contaren, Luvion, Phanurane, and Spiroletan, among others.

=== Availability ===
Canrenone appears to remain available only in Italy, although potassium canrenoate remains marketed in various other countries.

== See also ==
- Canrenoic acid
- Potassium canrenoate
