= Mineralocorticoid receptor antagonist =

Drug class

- Drug class
- Spironolactone, the most widely used antimineralocorticoid.

Class identifiers
- Synonyms: Aldosterone antagonistic; Mineralocorticoid antagonist
- Use: Diuretic; Chronic heart failure; Hypertension; Hyperaldosteronism; Conn's syndrome
- Biological target: Mineralocorticoid receptor
- Chemical class: Steroidal; Nonsteroidal

Legal status

A mineralocorticoid receptor antagonist (MRA or MCRA) or aldosterone antagonist, is a diuretic drug which antagonizes the action of aldosterone at mineralocorticoid receptors. This group of drugs is often used as adjunctive therapy, in combination with other drugs, for the management of chronic heart failure. Spironolactone, the first member of the class, is also used in the management of hyperaldosteronism (including Conn's syndrome) and female hirsutism (due to additional antiandrogen actions). Most antimineralocorticoids, including spironolactone, are steroidal spirolactones. Finerenone is a nonsteroidal antimineralocorticoid.

== Medical uses ==
Mineralocorticoid receptor antagonists are diuretic drugs that work primarily on the kidneys. They decrease sodium reabsorption, which leads to increased water excretion by the kidneys. By regulating water excretion, mineralocorticoid receptor antagonists lower blood pressure and reduce fluid around the heart which can be very beneficial in some cardiovascular conditions. Mineralocorticoid receptor antagonists have been used for many clinical conditions in the cardiovascular system. It has proven beneficial for diseases like primary aldosteronism, primary and resistant hypertension, heart failure and chronic kidney disease. They are often used with other medications, such as ACE inhibitors or beta blockers.

== Adverse effects ==
Increased urination is a commonly reported side effect, particularly during the initial phase following treatment initiation; this is mostly transient and tends to reduce with sustained treatment. Common side effects for antimineralocorticoid medications include nausea and vomiting, stomach cramps and diarrhoea. Clinically significant hyperkalemia is possible, and warrants serum potassium monitoring on a periodic basis. The pathophysiology of hyperkalemia is that antimineralocorticoid medications reduce potassium (K) excretion.

== Mechanism of action ==
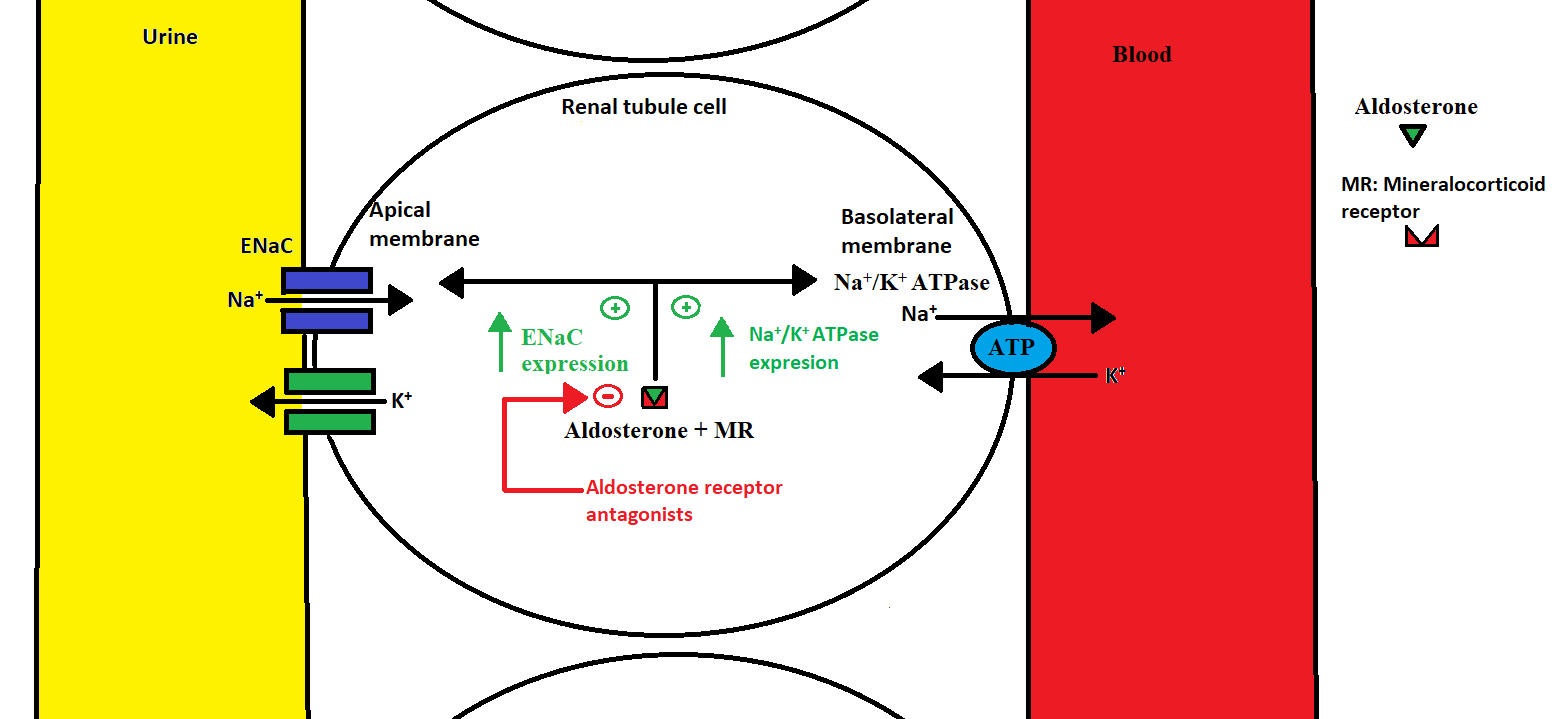
Antimineralocorticoid mechanism of action

Aldosterone is a mineralocorticoid which is synthesized in the adrenal glands. When aldosterone is secreted from the adrenal glands, it binds to the mineralocorticoid receptor in the renal tubule cell and forms a complex. This complex enhances transcription of specific DNA segments in the nucleus, leading to the formation of two protein transporters, Na+/K+ ATPase pump at the basolateral membrane and Na+ channel called ENaC, located at the apical membrane of the renal tubule cell. These protein transporters increase sodium reabsorption and potassium excretion in the distal tubule and the collecting duct of the kidneys. This helps the body to maintain normal volume and electrolyte balance, increasing the blood pressure.

Mineralocorticoid receptor antagonists decrease the aldosterone effect by binding to the mineralocorticoid receptor inhibiting aldosterone. This leads to higher levels of potassium in serum and increased sodium excretion, resulting in decreased body fluid and lower blood pressure.

== List of mineralocorticoid receptor antagonists ==
Antimineralocorticoid	Structure	Formula	Use	Brand name
Spironolactone		C_{24}H_{32}O_{4}S	Heart failure, Hypertension, nephrotic syndrome, Ascites, antiandrogenic	Aldactone, Spirix, Spiron
Eplerenone		C_{24}H_{30}O_{6}	Hypertension, Heart failure, Central Serous Retinopathy	Inspra
Canrenone		C_{22}H_{28}O_{3}	Diuretic	Contaren, Luvion, Phanurane, Spiroletan
Finerenone		C_{21}H_{22}N_{4}O_{3}	Potassium-sparing diuretic.	Kerendia
Mexrenone		C_{24}H_{32}O_{5}		

== Pharmacokinetics ==
When comparing the pharmacokinetic properties of spironolactone and eplerenone, it is clear that the two drugs differ. Spironolactone has shorter half-life (t1/2 = 1.3-1.4 hours) than eplerenone (t1/2 = 4–6 hours). Eplerenone goes through rapid metabolism by the liver to inactive metabolites (t1/2 = 4–6 hours). However, spironolactone is metabolized to three active metabolites, which give it prolonged activity (13.8 – 16. 5 hours). Spironolactone has a long half-life and is excreted 47-51% through kidneys. Patients with chronic kidney disease therefore require close monitoring when taking the drug. Spironolactone is also eliminated through feces (35-41%). The excretion of eplerenone is 67% through kidneys and 32% through feces. The information about excretion plays a critical role when determining the appropriate doses for patients with renal and/or hepatic dysfunction. It is very important to adjust the doses for patients with renal dysfunction because if they fail to eliminate the drug through their kidneys it could accumulate in the body, causing high concentration of potassium in the blood.

== Structure-activity relationship ==
Spironolactone and Eplerenone competitively block the binding of aldosterone to the mineralocorticoid receptor and hindering the reabsorption of sodium and chloride ions. The activity of mineralocorticoid antagonists is dependent on the presence of a y-lactone ring on the C-17 position. The C-7 position is also important for activity as substituents there sterically hinder the interaction of C-7-unsubstituted agonists such as aldosterone.

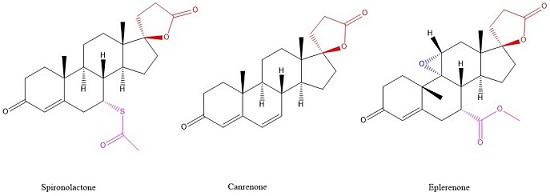
Antimineralocorticoids and highlighted groups that are important for activity. The y-lactone ring shown in red and the C-7 substituent in pink.

Eplerenone is a newer drug that was developed as a spironolactone analog with reduced adverse effects. In addition to the y-lactone ring and the substituent on C-7, eplerenone has a 9α,11α-epoxy group. This group is believed to be the reason why eplerenone has a 20-40-fold lower affinity for the mineralocorticoid receptor than spironolactone.

Despite the nonsteroidal nature of finerenone which yields a different lipophilicity and polarity profile for this compound, finerenone's affinity toward mineralocorticoid receptors is equal to that of spironolactone and 500 times that of eplerenone, hinting that the steroidal core component of most antimineralocorticoids is not essential for mineralocorticoid receptor affinity.

== History ==
The main goal of the identification of the first aldosterone antagonists, which happened during the 1950s, was to identify inhibitors of aldosterone activity. In those times, the main use of aldosterone was recognized as the control of renal sodium and the excretion of potassium.

Hans Selye, a Hungarian-Canadian endocrinologist, studied the effects of aldosterone antagonists on rats and found that the use of one of the first aldosterone antagonists, spironolactone, protected them from aldosterone-induced cardiac necrosis. The same year, 1959, spironolactone was launched as a potassium-sparing diuretic. It became clear years later that aldosterone antagonists inhibit a specific receptor protein. This protein has high affinity for aldosterone but also for cortisol in humans and corticosterone in mice and rats. For this reason, aldosterone antagonists were called mineralocorticoid receptor antagonists.

There have been three major waves in the pharmaceutical industry when it comes to research and development of mineralocorticoid receptor antagonists: The first wave took place within Searle Laboratories. This company identified, shortly after the purification of aldosterone, steroid-based spironolactone as the first anti-mineralocorticoid. The second wave was all about discovering much more specific steroidal anti-mineralocorticoids. The main active companies were Searle, Ciba-Geigy, Roussel Uclaf and Schering AG.

Around 50 years after Selye's work, several pharmaceutical companies began drug discovery programs. Their goal was to discover novel non-steroidal mineralocorticoid receptor antagonists for use as efficacious and safe drugs with the pharmacodynamics and pharmacokinetics well defined. Their goal was to use these candidates for a broad spectrum of diseases. This was essentially the third wave. The first mineralocorticoid receptor antagonists were all discovered and identified by in vivo experiments whereas the identification of novel non-steroidal mineralocorticoid receptor antagonists were done with high-throughput screening of millions of chemical compounds in various pharmaceutical companies.

== Examples ==
Skeletal formulae of aldosterone antagonists.

Members of this class in clinical use include:

- Widespread use
  - Spironolactone — the first and most widely used member of this class
  - Eplerenone — much more selective than spironolactone on target, but somewhat less potent and efficacious
- Uncommon use (to date)
  - Canrenone and potassium canrenoate — very limited use
  - Finerenone — nonsteroidal and more potent and selective than either eplerenone or spironolactone

Some drugs also have antimineralocorticoid effects secondary to their main mechanism of actions. Examples include progesterone, drospirenone, gestodene, metribolone, and benidipine.

== See also ==
- Potassium-sparing diuretic
- Mineralocorticoid
- Corticosteroid
- Antiglucocorticoid
