= Sex-hormonal agent =

Substance that modifies the effects of sex hormones

- Drug class

Class identifiers
- Synonyms: Sex-steroidal agent; Sex-hormone receptor modulator
- Use: Hormone therapy; Antihormone therapy; Hormonal contraception
- Biological target: Androgen receptor; Estrogen receptor; Progesterone receptor
- Chemical class: Steroidal; Nonsteroidal

Legal status

A sex-hormonal agent, also known as a sex-hormone receptor modulator, is a type of hormonal agent which specifically modulates the effects of sex hormones and of their biological targets, the sex hormone receptors. The sex hormones include androgens such as testosterone, estrogens such as estradiol, and progestogens such as progesterone. Sex-hormonal agents may be either steroidal or nonsteroidal in chemical structure and may serve to either enhance, inhibit, or have mixed effects on the function of the sex hormone systems.

Sex-hormonal agents are used in medicine for a variety of purposes including hormone therapy (e.g., menopausal hormone therapy, androgen replacement therapy, transgender hormone therapy), antihormone therapy (e.g., androgen deprivation therapy, estrogen deprivation therapy), and hormonal contraception, among others.

== Types and examples ==
=== Androgen receptor (AR) modulators ===
- Androgens and anabolic steroids (AR agonists)
  - Examples: testosterone, androstanolone (dihydrotestosterone), prasterone (dehydroepiandrosterone), nandrolone (nortestosterone), methyltestosterone, metandienone (methandrostenolone), oxandrolone, stanozolol, danazol
- Selective androgen receptor modulators (AR mixed agonists/antagonists)
  - Examples: enobosarm (ostarine; GTx-024, MK-2866), andarine (GTx-007)
- Antiandrogens (AR antagonists)
  - Examples: cyproterone acetate, chlormadinone acetate, spironolactone, flutamide, bicalutamide, enzalutamide, apalutamide

=== Estrogen receptor (ER) modulators ===
- Estrogens (ER agonists)
  - Examples: estradiol, estrone, estriol, estetrol, conjugated estrogens (Premarin), ethinylestradiol, diethylstilbestrol (stilbestrol), chlorotrianisene
- Selective estrogen receptor modulators (ER mixed agonists/antagonists)
  - Examples: tamoxifen, clomifene, cyclofenil, raloxifene, toremifene, lasofoxifene, ospemifene, bazedoxifene
- Antiestrogens (ER antagonists)
  - Examples: fulvestrant, ICI-164384, TAS-108 (SR-16234), ZB716 (fulvestrant-3-boronic acid), ethamoxytriphetol (MER-25)

=== Progesterone receptor (PR) modulators ===
- Progestogens and progestins (PR agonists)
  - Examples: progesterone, medroxyprogesterone acetate, norethisterone (norethindrone), levonorgestrel, drospirenone, dydrogesterone
- Selective progesterone receptor modulators (PR mixed agonists/antagonists)
  - Examples: mifepristone, ulipristal acetate, telapristone (CDB-4124), vilaprisan (BAY-1002670)
- Antiprogestogens (PR antagonists)
  - Examples: aglepristone, onapristone (ZK-89299)

=== Indirect sex-hormonal agents ===
Drugs that indirectly influence sex hormone systems, such as antigonadotropins like GnRH analogues and prolactin releasers (e.g., D_{2} receptor antagonists), progonadotropins like GnRH agonists, and steroidogenesis inhibitors like aromatase inhibitors and androgen synthesis inhibitors, are also sex-hormonal agents.

== See also ==
- List of investigational sex-hormonal agents
