= Asoprisnil ecamate =

Chemical compound

Clinical data
- Other names: J-956; 11β-(4-((E)-(Ethylcarbamoyl-oxyimino)methyl)phenyl)-17β-methoxy-17α-(methoxymethyl)estra-4,9-dien-3-one

Identifiers
- IUPAC name: [(E)-[4-[(8S,11R,13S,14S,17S)-17-Methoxy-17-(methoxymethyl)-13-methyl-3-oxo-1,2,6,7,8,11,12,14,15,16-decahydrocyclopenta[a]phenanthren-11-yl]phenyl]methylideneamino] N-ethylcarbamate
- CAS Number: 222732-94-7
- PubChem CID: 9578571
- ChemSpider: 7852933
- UNII: 7JZY47BZJR
- ChEMBL: ChEMBL2107728
- CompTox Dashboard (EPA): DTXSID701337166

Chemical and physical data
- Formula: C_{31}H_{40}N_{2}O_{5}
- Molar mass: 520.670 g·mol^{−1}
- 3D model (JSmol): Interactive image
- SMILES: CCNC(=O)O/N=C/C1=CC=C(C=C1)[C@H]2C[C@]3([C@@H](CC[C@]3(COC)OC)[C@H]4C2=C5CCC(=O)C=C5CC4)C
- InChI: InChI=1S/C31H40N2O5/c1-5-32-29(35)38-33-18-20-6-8-21(9-7-20)26-17-30(2)27(14-15-31(30,37-4)19-36-3)25-12-10-22-16-23(34)11-13-24(22)28(25)26/h6-9,16,18,25-27H,5,10-15,17,19H2,1-4H3,(H,32,35)/b33-18+/t25-,26+,27-,30-,31+/m0/s1; Key:XMCOWVOJIVSMEO-RCCUTSCYSA-N

Asoprisnil ecamate (INN; development code J-956) is a synthetic, steroidal selective progesterone receptor modulator (SPRM) which was under development for the treatment of endometriosis, uterine fibroids, and menopausal symptoms but was discontinued. It is a potent and highly selective ligand of the progesterone receptor with mixed agonistic and antagonistic activity and much reduced antiglucocorticoid activity relative to mifepristone. The drug reached phase III clinical trials for the aforementioned indications prior to its discontinuation.

== See also ==
- Asoprisnil
- Ulipristal acetate
- Vilaprisan
