= Lonaprisan =

Chemical compound

Clinical data
- Other names: ZK-230211; BAY 86-5044; ZK-PRA; 11β-(4-acetylphenyl)-17β-hydroxy-17α-(1,1,2,2,2-pentafluoroethyl)estra-4,9-dien-3-one
- Routes of administration: Oral

Identifiers
- IUPAC name: (8S,11R,13S,14S,17S)-11-(4-acetylphenyl)-17-hydroxy-13-methyl-17-(1,1,2,2,2-pentafluoroethyl)-1,2,6,7,8,11,12,14,15,16-decahydrocyclopenta[a]phenanthren-3-one
- CAS Number: 211254-73-8
- PubChem CID: 6918548
- ChemSpider: 5293745
- UNII: F5Z5EL4D26
- KEGG: D10016
- ChEMBL: ChEMBL146032
- CompTox Dashboard (EPA): DTXSID60893551
- ECHA InfoCard: 100.190.674

Chemical and physical data
- Formula: C_{28}H_{29}F_{5}O_{3}
- Molar mass: 508.529 g·mol^{−1}
- 3D model (JSmol): Interactive image
- SMILES: CC(=O)C1=CC=C(C=C1)[C@H]2C[C@]3([C@@H](CC[C@]3(C(C(F)(F)F)(F)F)O)[C@H]4C2=C5CCC(=O)C=C5CC4)C
- InChI: InChI=1S/C28H29F5O3/c1-15(34)16-3-5-17(6-4-16)22-14-25(2)23(11-12-26(25,36)27(29,30)28(31,32)33)21-9-7-18-13-19(35)8-10-20(18)24(21)22/h3-6,13,21-23,36H,7-12,14H2,1-2H3/t21-,22+,23-,25-,26-/m0/s1; Key:VHZPUDNSVGRVMB-RXDLHWJPSA-N

Lonaprisan (INN, USAN; development codes ZK-230211, BAY 86-5044, and ZK-PRA) is a synthetic, steroidal antiprogestogen which was under development by Bayer HealthCare Pharmaceuticals for the treatment of endometriosis, dysmenorrhea, and breast cancer but was discontinued. It is a potent and highly selective silent antagonist of the progesterone receptor (PR). The drug reached phase II clinical trials prior to its discontinuation.

== See also ==
- Mifepristone
- Onapristone
- Ulipristal acetate
- Vilaprisan
