= Progesterone receptor =

Cytoplasmic receptor protein found inside cells

PGR
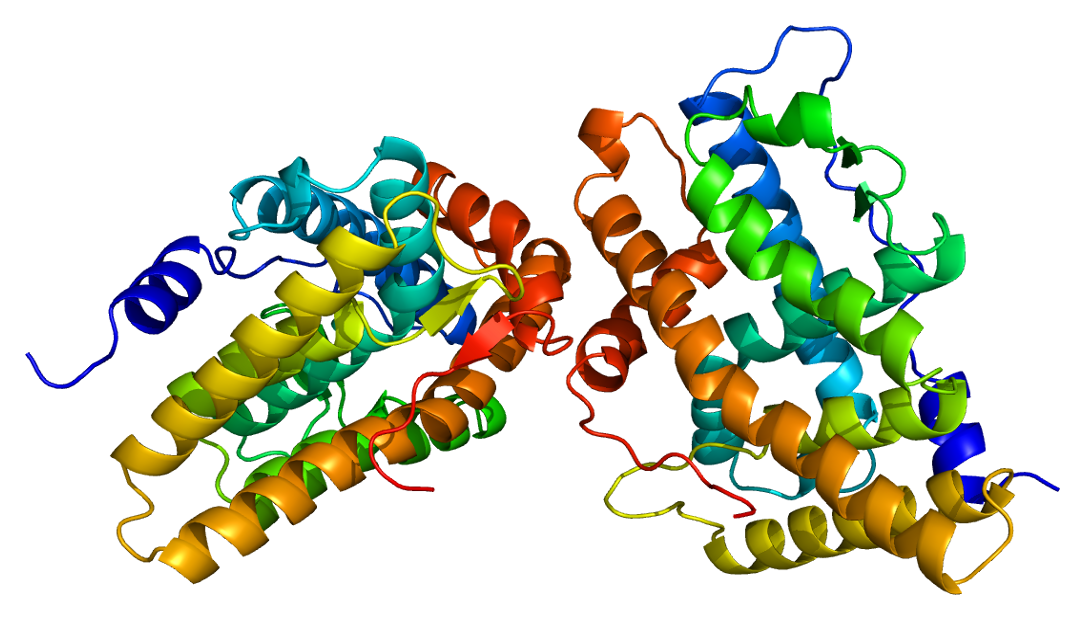

Identifiers
- Aliases: PGR, NR3C3, PR, progesterone receptor
- External IDs: OMIM: 607311; MGI: 97567; GeneCards: PGR
Available structures
PDB	Ortholog search: PDBe RCSB
PDB	List of PDB id codes 4OAR, 1A28, 1E3K, 1SQN, 1SR7, 1ZUC, 2C7A, 2OVH, 2OVM, 2W8Y, 3D90, 3G8O, 3HQ5, 3KBA, 3ZR7, 3ZRA, 3ZRB, 4A2J, 4APU, 5CC0

Gene location (Human)
Chr.	Chromosome 11 (human)
Band	11q22.1	Start	101,029,624 bp
Band	11q22.1	End	101,129,813 bp

Gene location (Mouse)
Chr.	Chromosome 9 (mouse)
Band	9|9 A1	Start	8,899,834 bp
Band	9|9 A1	End	8,968,612 bp
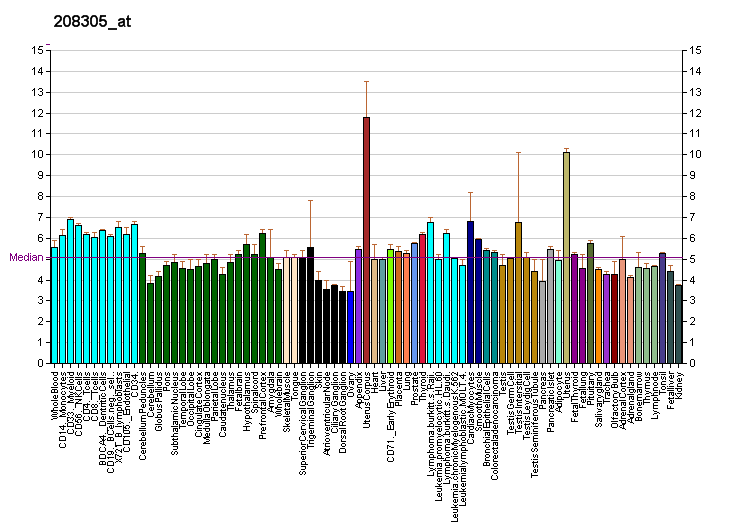
RNA expression pattern
Bgee	Human / Mouse (ortholog); Top expressed in: endometrium; germinal epithelium; canal of the cervix; body of uterus; right uterine tube; tail of epididymis; myometrium; seminal vesicula; ectocervix; right ventricle / Top expressed in: gastrula; decidua; substantia nigra; uterus; ventromedial nucleus; facial motor nucleus; arcuate nucleus; anterior amygdaloid area; prefrontal cortex; lateral septal nucleus; More reference expression data
BioGPS	More reference expression data
Gene ontology
Molecular function	DNA binding; sequence-specific DNA binding; DNA-binding transcription factor activity; ATPase binding; zinc ion binding; DNA-binding transcription activator activity, RNA polymerase II-specific; metal ion binding; RNA polymerase II cis-regulatory region sequence-specific DNA binding; steroid hormone receptor activity; steroid binding; protein binding; enzyme binding; signaling receptor binding; lipid binding; nuclear receptor activity; identical protein binding; DNA-binding transcription factor activity, RNA polymerase II-specific
Cellular component	cytoplasm; membrane; nucleoplasm; mitochondrial outer membrane; mitochondrion; nucleus; cytosol
Biological process	regulation of transcription, DNA-templated; cell-cell signaling; negative regulation of gene expression; transcription, DNA-templated; transcription initiation from RNA polymerase II promoter; signal transduction; steroid hormone mediated signaling pathway; positive regulation of transcription by RNA polymerase II; ovulation from ovarian follicle; epithelial cell maturation; mammary gland development; paracrine signaling; lung alveolus development; regulation of epithelial cell proliferation; progesterone receptor signaling pathway; tertiary branching involved in mammary gland duct morphogenesis
Sources:Amigo / QuickGO
Orthologs
Databases	NCBI: entry; OMA: entry
Species	Human	Mouse
Entrez	5241	18667
Ensembl	ENSG00000082175	ENSMUSG00000031870
UniProt	P06401	Q00175
RefSeq (mRNA)	NM_000926; NM_001202474; NM_001271161; NM_001271162	NM_008829
RefSeq (protein)	NP_000917; NP_001189403; NP_001258090; NP_001258091	NP_032855
Location (UCSC)	Chr 11: 101.03 – 101.13 Mb	Chr 9: 8.9 – 8.97 Mb
PubMed search
- Wikidata
View/Edit Human	View/Edit Mouse

The progesterone receptor (PR), also known as NR3C3 or nuclear receptor subfamily 3, group C, member 3, is a protein found inside cells. It is activated by the steroid hormone progesterone.

In humans, PR is encoded by a single PGR gene residing on chromosome 11q22, it has three isoforms: PR-A, PR-B, and PR-C. Though PR-A and PR-B are much more well studied compared to PR-C. The PR-B is the positive regulator of the effects of progesterone, while PR-A serve to antagonize the effects of PR-B.

== Mechanism ==
Progesterone is necessary to induce activation of the progesterone receptors. When no binding hormone is present the carboxyl terminal inhibits transcription. Binding to a hormone induces a structural change that removes the inhibitory action. Progesterone antagonists prevent the structural reconfiguration.

After progesterone binds to the receptor, restructuring with dimerization follows and the complex enters the nucleus and binds to DNA. There transcription takes place, resulting in formation of messenger RNA that is translated by ribosomes to produce specific proteins.

== Structure ==
Progesterone receptor, N-terminal

Identifiers
- Symbol: Progest_rcpt_N
- Pfam: PF02161
- InterPro: IPR000128
Available protein structures:
- PDB: IPR000128 PF02161 (ECOD; PDBsum)
- AlphaFold: IPR000128; PF02161

In common with other steroid receptors, the progesterone receptor has a N-terminal regulatory domain, a DNA binding domain, a hinge section, and a C-terminal ligand binding domain. A special transcription activation function (TAF), called TAF3, is present in the progesterone receptor-B, in a B-upstream segment (BUS) at the amino acid terminal. This segment is not present in the receptor-A.

== Isoforms ==
The single-copy human (hPR) gene uses separate promoters and translational start sites to produce three isoforms, PR-A, -B, and -C. PR-A and -B are identical except for an additional 165 amino acids present only in the N terminus of PR-B. PR-C is even smaller, starting at the 595th amino acid of PR-B. Although the three isoforms share many important structural domains, they are functionally distinct.

PR-A and PR-B are disticnt transcription factors, which mediate their own response genes and physiological effects with little overlap.

PR-C being the smallest, does not have the important AF1, AF3, or DNA-binding domains. Thus, PR-C is not a transcription factor. However, PR-C can dimerize, participate in nuclear translocation, and modulate the actions of PR-A and PR-B.

Selective ablation of PR-A in a mouse model, resulting in exclusive production of PR-B, unexpectedly revealed that PR-B contributes to, rather than inhibits, epithelial cell proliferation both in response to estrogen alone and in the presence of progesterone and estrogen. These results suggest that in the uterus, the PR-A isoform is necessary to oppose estrogen-induced proliferation as well as PR-B-dependent proliferation.

== Functional polymorphisms ==
Six variable sites, including four polymorphisms and five common haplotypes have been identified in the human PR gene . One promoter region polymorphism, +331G/A, creates a unique transcription start site. Biochemical assays showed that the +331G/A polymorphism increases transcription of the PR gene, favoring production of hPR-B in an Ishikawa endometrial cancer cell line.

Several studies have now shown no association between progesterone receptor gene +331G/A polymorphisms and breast or endometrial cancers. However, these follow-up studies lacked the sample size and statistical power to make any definitive conclusions, due to the rarity of the +331A SNP. It is currently unknown which if any polymorphisms in this receptor are of significance to cancer. A study of 21 non-European populations identified two markers within the PROGINS haplotype of the PR gene as positively correlated with ovarian and breast cancer.

== Animal studies ==
=== Development ===
Knockout mice of the PR have been found to have severely impaired lobuloalveolar development of the mammary glands as well as delayed but otherwise normal mammary ductal development at puberty.

=== Behavior ===
During rodent perinatal life, progesterone receptor (PR) is known to be transiently expressed in both the ventral tegmental area (VTA) and the medial prefrontal cortex (mPFC) of the mesocortical dopaminergic pathway. PR activity during this time period impacts the development of dopaminergic innervation of the mPFC from the VTA. If PR activity is altered, a change in dopaminergic innervation of the mPFC is seen and tyrosine hydroxylase (TH), the rate-limiting enzyme for dopamine synthesis, in the VTA will also be impacted. TH expression in this area is an indicator of dopaminergic activity, which is believed to be involved in normal and critical development of complex cognitive behaviors that are mediated by the mesocortical dopaminergic pathway, such as working memory, attention, behavioral inhibition, and cognitive flexibility.

Research has shown that when a PR antagonist, such as RU486 (also known as mifepristone), is administered to rats during the neonatal period, decreased tyrosine hydroxylase immunoreactive (TH-ir) cells density, a strong co-expresser with PR-immunoreactivity (PR-ir), is seen in the mPFC of juvenile rodents. Later on, in adulthood, decreased levels of TH-ir in the VTA are also shown. This alteration in TH-ir fiber expression, an indicator of altered dopaminergic activity resulting from neonatal PR antagonist administration, has been shown to impair later performance on tasks that measure behavioral inhibition and impulsivity, as well as cognitive flexibility in adulthood. Similar cognitive flexibility impairments were also seen in PR knockout mice as a result of reduced dopaminergic activity in the VTA.

Conversely, when a PR agonist, such as 17α-hydroxyprogesterone caproate, is administered to rodents during perinatal life, as the mesocortical dopaminergic pathway is developing, dopaminergic innervation of the mPFC increases. As a result, TH-ir fiber density also increases. Interestingly, this increase in TH-ir fibers and dopaminergic activity is also linked to impaired cognitive flexibility with increased perseveration later on in life.

In combination, these findings suggest that PR expression during early development impact later cognitive functioning in rodents. Furthermore, it appears as though abnormal levels of PR activity during this critical period of mesocortical dopaminergic pathway development may have profound effects on specific behavioral neural circuits involved in the formation of later complex cognitive behavior.

== Ligands ==
=== Agonists ===
- Endogenous progestogens (e.g., progesterone)
- Synthetic progestogens (e.g., norethisterone, levonorgestrel, medroxyprogesterone acetate, megestrol acetate, dydrogesterone, drospirenone)
- Certain corticosteroids (Mometasone)

=== Mixed ===
- Selective progesterone receptor modulators (e.g., ulipristal acetate, telapristone acetate, vilaprisan, asoprisnil, asoprisnil ecamate)

=== Antagonists ===
- Antiprogestogens (e.g., mifepristone, aglepristone, onapristone, lonaprisan, lilopristone, toripristone)

== Interactions ==
Progesterone receptor has been shown to interact with many other proteins since it is a transcription factor with many cofactors. A small selection of these includes:

- KLF9,
- Nuclear receptor co-repressor 2, and
- UBE3A.
- Estrogen receptor

== See also ==
- Membrane progesterone receptor
- Selective progesterone receptor modulator
- Phytoprogestogen
