= Toripristone =

Chemical compound

Clinical data
- Other names: RU-40555; 17β-Hydroxy-11β-[4-[methyl(1-methylethyl)amino]phenyl]-17α-(1-propyn-1-yl)estra-4,9-dien-3-one

Identifiers
- IUPAC name: (8S,11R,13S,14S,17S)-17-Hydroxy-13-methyl-11-[4-[methyl(propan-2-yl)amino]phenyl]-17-prop-1-ynyl-1,2,6,7,8,11,12,14,15,16-decahydrocyclopenta[a]phenanthren-3-one
- CAS Number: 91935-26-1
- PubChem CID: 3086344
- ChemSpider: 2342997
- UNII: 711D76P884
- ChEMBL: ChEMBL2105533
- CompTox Dashboard (EPA): DTXSID50238795

Chemical and physical data
- Formula: C_{31}H_{39}NO_{2}
- Molar mass: 457.658 g·mol^{−1}
- 3D model (JSmol): Interactive image
- SMILES: CC#C[C@@]1(CC[C@@H]2[C@@]1(C[C@@H](C3=C4CCC(=O)C=C4CC[C@@H]23)C5=CC=C(C=C5)N(C)C(C)C)C)O
- InChI: InChI=1S/C31H39NO2/c1-6-16-31(34)17-15-28-26-13-9-22-18-24(33)12-14-25(22)29(26)27(19-30(28,31)4)21-7-10-23(11-8-21)32(5)20(2)3/h7-8,10-11,18,20,26-28,34H,9,12-15,17,19H2,1-5H3/t26-,27+,28-,30-,31-/m0/s1; Key:LOIYXTZQBQVHSF-PABOLRIOSA-N

Toripristone (INN; developmental code name RU-40555) is a synthetic, steroidal antiglucocorticoid as well as antiprogestogen which was never marketed. It is reported as a potent and highly selective antagonist of the glucocorticoid receptor (GR) (K_{i} = 2.4 nM), though it also acts as an antagonist of the progesterone receptor (PR). The pharmacological profile of toripristone is said to be very similar to that of mifepristone, except that toripristone does not bind to orosomucoid (α1-acid glycoprotein). The drug has been used to study the hypothalamic-pituitary-adrenal axis and has been used as a radiotracer for the GR. Its INN was given in 1990.

== See also ==
- Aglepristone
- Lilopristone
- Onapristone
- Telapristone
