= Oral contraceptive pill =

Oral contraceptive pills (OCPs), also known as birth control pills, are medications taken by mouth for the purpose of birth control. The introduction of the birth control pill ("the pill") in 1960 revolutionized the options for contraception, sparking vibrant discussion in the scientific and social science literature and the media. Much attention focused on issues of women's rights, including ethics and personal choice. But these medications also introduced new questions about risk.

== Female ==
Two types of female oral contraceptive pills, taken once per day, are widely available:

- The combined oral contraceptive pill contains estrogen and a progestin; colloquially known as "the pill".
- The progestogen-only pill, colloquially known as "the minipill".

For perfect use (regular use according to the prescriber's instructions), it is 99% effective. For typical use, it is 91% effective, primarily due to non-adherence with the recommended daily dosing regimen. Side effects of the pill may include headache, dizziness, nausea, sore breasts, mood changes, acne (though it may also help reduce acne, along with certain types of cancer and other sources of medical risk), and bloating.

One pill offers the benefit of only having to be taken once a week:

- Ormeloxifene, a selective estrogen receptor modulator

Emergency contraception pills ("morning after pills") are taken at the time of intercourse, or within a few days afterwards:

- Levonorgestrel, sold under the brand name Plan B
- Ulipristal acetate
- Mifepristone and misoprostol, when used in combination, are more than 95% effective during the first 50 days of pregnancy.

=== Side effects ===
Breast cancer: studies show a higher risk of breast cancer among active users of hormonal contraceptives (especially oral contraceptive pills) compared to non-users. This study also specifically mentioned that it is the estrogen that plays the role regarding the development of breast cancer, while the role for progestin is still unclear.

Stroke: stroke is considered another side-effect for hormonal contraceptives and more importantly oral contraceptives, more importantly in the first year of use.

Depression: Evidence shows that use of oral contraceptives is associated with an increase in the risk of depression. Although the risk declines with continuation, there is still a higher risk of depression among users and non-users of oral contraceptives. Women using oral contraceptives have been shown to have reduced serotonin signaling capacity in central parts of the brain compared to non-users. The effect is largest in the hippocampus, which is responsible for memory formation. Serotonin has a central role in depression, as the main antidepressant medications are SSRIs, which the main of action is to increase serotonin levels in the brain.

== Male ==
- Male oral contraceptives are not available commercially, although several types are under research and development.
