= Regonyl =

Steroidal drug

Clinical data
- Other names: TX-380; NSC-69588; 17α-Ethynyl-5α-androst-2-en-17β-ol 17β-acetate; 17β-Acetoxy-5α,17α-pregn-2-en-20-yne

Identifiers
- IUPAC name: [(5S,8R,9S,10S,13S,14S,17R)-17-ethynyl-10,13-dimethyl-1,4,5,6,7,8,9,11,12,14,15,16-dodecahydrocyclopenta[a]phenanthren-17-yl] acetate
- CAS Number: 124-85-6
- PubChem CID: 159358
- ChemSpider: 140149
- UNII: CBY5520366
- KEGG: C15186
- ChEBI: CHEBI:79703
- CompTox Dashboard (EPA): DTXSID20924673

Chemical and physical data
- Formula: C_{23}H_{32}O_{2}
- Molar mass: 340.507 g·mol^{−1}
- 3D model (JSmol): Interactive image
- SMILES: CC(=O)O[C@]1(CC[C@@H]2[C@@]1(CC[C@H]3[C@H]2CC[C@@H]4[C@@]3(CC=CC4)C)C)C#C
- InChI: InChI=1S/C23H32O2/c1-5-23(25-16(2)24)15-12-20-18-10-9-17-8-6-7-13-21(17,3)19(18)11-14-22(20,23)4/h1,6-7,17-20H,8-15H2,2-4H3/t17-,18-,19+,20+,21+,22+,23+/m1/s1; Key:SQRBBVVZRKZEPF-OWNQEUAMSA-N

Regonyl (developmental code name TX-380), also known as 17α-ethynyl-5α-androst-2-en-17β-ol 17β-acetate, is a steroidal drug described as an antiprogestogen and "antiprolactin" (prolactin inhibitor). It was studied for lactation inhibition in bitches. It has minimal to no androgenic, estrogenic, or progestogenic activity but is said to strongly inhibit the hypothalamic–pituitary–gonadal axis at central and peripheral levels and to markedly oppose the action of progesterone. However, the antiprogestogenic effects of regonyl do not appear to be due to direct interaction with the progesterone receptor. The actions of regonyl result in estrus cycle disturbances and impaired ovulation. Regonyl was proposed for use in humans, for instance in the treatment of gynecological disorders like endometriosis and benign breast disease, and in hormonal contraception.
