= KwikMed =

American online pharmacy

- Industry: Healthcare
- Founded: 2001
- Founder: Peter Ax, CEO
- Headquarters: Scottsdale, Arizona, United States
- Website: http://www.kwikmed.com/

KwikMed is an approved online pharmacy in the United States which has been granted regulatory approval to operate and sell medications online. Based in Salt Lake City, Utah, KwikMed's parent company, Phoenix Capital Management, is located in Scottsdale, Arizona. Specifically, KwikMed has been granted regulatory approval to prescribe medications for erectile dysfunction, male pattern hair loss and smoking cessation provided specific operating procedures are followed.

KwikMed has been involved in the creation of legislation in the state of Utah focused on creating a structural framework for the delivery of healthcare online and for the fulfillment of prescriptions on the Internet. On March 30, 2010, the State of Utah became the first state to establish a regulatory board specifically focused on regulating Internet pharmacies. This regulatory board is composed of experts in the healthcare field who are focused on facilitating the safe and effective delivery of health care online. Utah signed into law S.B. 274, the "Online Prescribing, Dispensing, and Facilitation Act" which was sponsored by Utah State Senator Curt Bramble and Representative Rebecca D. Lockhart.

== Company history ==
=== Introduction ===
October 16, 2001 - KwikMed was purchased by Peter Ax, managing partner of Phoenix Capital Management (PCM). Peter Ax was formerly senior vice president and head of private equity at Lehman Brothers where he was responsible for the institutional private placement of late stage venture capital financing. The previous owners of KwikMed were criminally prosecuted for writing prescriptions on the Internet without a valid physician and for illegally repackaged medications obtained from a drug wholesaler.

The cornerstone of KwikMed's health delivery system has been the creation of advanced software which takes a complete online medical history of the patient by asking specific questions of the patient. Depending upon how the patient responds, additional questions may be asked. All of the patient data collected during that online interview is compared to standardized medical scales to see if the patient is an alcoholic, is suffering from a mental illness, smokes too much, has an aggressive personality, etc... All of this information is collected by KwikMed physicians who then make a determination to 1) treat the patient with the patient requested medication, 2) suggest alternatives therapies for the patient, 3) collect additional data by email or phone call, 4)that the patient must be treated in a face-to-face setting and not allow any prescription to be written for this patient.

=== Time line ===
- Oct. 2001 - Utah Division of Occupational & Professional Licensing (DOPL) issues a subpoena to KwikMed regarding the past business practices of KwikMed's former owners.
- Oct. 2001 – PCM initiates discussion with the DOPL about revising KwikMed's practices in order to deliver healthcare safely on the internet.
- 2002 – KwikMed and medical experts make multiple presentations to the Utah DOPL, and Utah Boards of Medicine and Pharmacy.
- Dec. 2002 – KwikMed enters into a non-disciplinary Consent Order with the state of Utah which outlines specific operating procedures KwikMed must follow.
- June 2003 – First version of KwikMed Software launched which complies with Consent Order.
- Jan. 2004 – Utah legislature discusses legislation to regulate Internet pharmacies. KwikMed assists in educating regulators and legislators about online pharmacies which leads to regulation designed to allow online pharmacies to operate in Utah provided specific operating practices are followed.
- Jan 2004 – Second version of KwikMed software released providing significant enhancements to the system.
- June 2004 – KwikMed continues to refine its “best practices” and enhanced medical assessment and diagnostic tools.
- Dec. 2004 – University of Utah begins a formal research study of KwikMed's practices compared to traditional medicine.
- Jan. 2005 – Utah legislature again discusses legislation which would regulate Internet pharmacies. KwikMed assists legislators and regulators to understand the intricacies of internet pharmacies.
- May 2006 – Google allows KwikMed to become the only online prescribing website allowed to advertise on its site.
- Jan. 2007 – KwikMed presents its model for the delivery of online healthcare to various legislators and regulators.
- June 2007– KwikMed submits to Utah DOPL a formal request to be allowed to sell Chantix (smoking cessation medicine) online.
- June 2008 – Mayo Clinic Proceedings publishes University of Utah research which compares KwikMed's model for the delivery of healthcare to traditional healthcare which involves a patient meeting with a physician in a face-to-face setting.
- October 2008 – Peter Ax presents KwikMed's business model at Health 2.0 conference in at The Marriott in San Francisco, California.
- Feb. 2010 - Google announces that only online pharmacies verified by National Association Boards of Pharmacy and certified through the VIPPS program will be allowed to advertise.
- March 30, 2010 - Senator Curt Bramble signs Senate Bill 274 into law using the KwikMed business model as the standard for licensing and regulating online pharmacies. Utah signed into law the "Online Prescribing, Dispensing, and Facilitation Act" which was sponsored by Utah State Senator Curt Bramble.Senator Bramble remarked on Utah's "fairly remarkable track record with the one company that has been subject to [a] Consent Agreement."
- December 2010 - KwikMed start to sell the prescription drug called ella, an emergency contraception pill known as ulipristal acetate and marketed by Watson Pharmaceuticals.

== Regulatory movement ==
Since 2001, Peter Ax and KwikMed have been involved in the development of regulatory standards for online pharmacy safety. Through discussions with physicians, medical experts, state and federal legislators, and regulators, KwikMed has developed a version of an electronic medical record and patented online medical assessment software that has become a standard for the online prescribing of medications. Recently enacted Utah legislation codified KwikMed business practices in what has become the standard for states wanting to enact legislation to regulate and protect its citizens. In 2010 Utah passed the Online Prescribing, Dispensing, and Facilitation Act . The audio version of the Utah state legislature hearing is also available online.

The first face to face meeting between and among PCM, its counsel, members of the Utah DOPL and representatives of the Utah Attorney General's office took place in February 2002. During this meeting the following was established -

- The contours and services provided by KwikMed were identified
- DOPL expressed concerns regarding e-medicine
- Open communication was facilitated between KwikMed and DOPL

Utah DOPL and PCM enter into The Utah Consent Order in December 2002. The Consent Order required KwikMed (PCM) to design and implement an appropriate interactive medical assessment tool to be used by website users to ensure that each user provides a complete detailed medical history and physical evaluation sufficient to enable PCM's contract physicians to establish a diagnosis and to identify underlying conditions and/or contra-indications to the treatments recommended by those physicians. By the terms of this agreement, PCM was required to secure the DOPL's approval before any additional drugs could be prescribed and dispensed via the website. These medications included the erectile dysfunction medication Viagra and the male pattern hair loss medication Propecia. Although DOPL originally granted approval for PCM to dispense the weight loss drug Xenical and the arthritis medication Celebrex, PCM later asked to have these two removed from its approved list of drugs based on PCM's concern over the safety of these medications. Later, two addition erectile dysfunction medications, Cialis and Levitra, and the smoking cessation medication, Chantix, were added to the list of approved medications for PCM to distribute with a valid prescription.

Additionally, by entering into the Consent Order, PCM agreed to allow the DOPL representatives to access PCM's contract physicians and pharmacies to inspect medical and pharmacy records, as permitted by state regulations.

== "Safety of Prescribing PDE-5 Inhibitors via e-Medicine vs Traditional Medicine" ==
=== University of Utah research as listed in Mayo Clinic Proceedings ===
In August 2008, the Mayo Clinic Proceedings vol. 83 no. 8 issue included published the findings of research conducted at the University of Utah. This research compared KwikMed's model for the online delivery of healthcare to more traditional interactions between physicians and patients which typically take place in a face-to-face office setting.

The following researchers took part in the study: Mark A. Munger, PharmD; Gregory J. Stoddard, MS; Allen R. Wenner, MD; John W. Bachman, MD; John H. Jurige, MD; Laura Poe, RN; and Diana L. Baker, RN.

The objective: to discover if an online medical consultation could diagnose and treat erectile dysfunction as safely as a traditional face-to-face visit with a physician.

The study was designed with by comparing electronic medical records. 102,734 of these records came from KwikMed and 110,000 were the University of Utah multidisciplinary primary care systems records. The study then consisted of 500 stratified random sampling of e-medicine records.

==== Statistical analysis ====
Demographics, medical history, drug history

- Categorical data: X2 or Fisher Exact test
- Unordered categorical data (> 2 categories): x2 or Fisher-Freeman-Halton test
- Ordered categorical data: Mann-Whitney test
- Continuous variables: 2-sample t-test with a Mann-Whitney test if data were skewed

Safety comparisons

- Non-inferiority studies

- 2-sided, 95% CI 0.95
- If non-inferiority demonstrated, superiority was tested
- Multiple comparisons: Bonferroni multiple comparison procedure

Unmatched samples (balancing groups)

- Multivariate modified Poisson regression test (fitted to traditional medicine)

==== Results ====
Physical examination

- Traditional medicine

- Complete (including genitalia): 19.8%
- Partial (no genitalia): 47%
- No exam done: 32.2%

- E-medicine: not done 100%

- General medical examination

- < 1 year: 80%
- 1–2 years: 17%
- 3–4 years: 2%
- 5–6 years: 0.8%
- Never: )0.4%

Median: < 1 year

- Comparison of conducting a physical examination: p<0.001

ED prescription outcomes

- Traditional medicine

- 100% prescribed (face-to-face)
- 8.3% phone requests prescribed
- 9.4% assessed inappropriate by study investigators

- E-medicine

- 83% prescribed (software only)
- 95.4% prescribed after MD consultation
- 4.6% prescription denied
- 2.2% assessed as inappropriate by study investigators

- Comparison of % prescribed: p<0.001
- Comparison of % inappropriate: p=0.007

==== Results ====
- Written manufacturer product information provided to all e-medicine clients
- 75.2% of e-medicine clients also receive tailored electronic messages sent to them with the medication
- 48.2% of traditional medicine patients had oral instructions recorded at the target visit
- 25% of prescriptions renewed, independent of the system

==== Conclusions ====
1. First independent, comprehensive study of a regulated Internet prescribing system
2. The e-medicine system matches or exceeds all traditional medical practice in all aspects of patient safety
3. State regulatory agencies should consider licensing Internet prescribing companies

== See also ==
- Online pharmacy
- e-medicine
