= Asoprisnil =

Chemical compound

Clinical data
- ATC code: None

Identifiers
- IUPAC name: (8S,11R,13S,14S,17S)-11-[4-[(E)-hydroxyiminomethyl]phenyl]-17-methoxy-17-(methoxymethyl)-13-methyl-1,2,6,7,8,11,12,14,15,16-decahydrocyclopenta[a]phenanthren-3-one
- CAS Number: 199396-76-4
- PubChem CID: 9577221
- IUPHAR/BPS: 2883
- ChemSpider: 7851660
- UNII: 72W09924WP
- KEGG: D02996
- ChEMBL: ChEMBL267431
- CompTox Dashboard (EPA): DTXSID40904033

Chemical and physical data
- Formula: C_{28}H_{35}NO_{4}
- Molar mass: 449.591 g·mol^{−1}
- 3D model (JSmol): Interactive image
- SMILES: O=C5\C=C4/C(=C3/[C@@H](c1ccc(\C=N\O)cc1)C[C@]2([C@@H](CC[C@@]2(OC)COC)[C@@H]3CC4)C)CC5
- InChI: InChI=1S/C28H35NO4/c1-27-15-24(19-6-4-18(5-7-19)16-29-31)26-22-11-9-21(30)14-20(22)8-10-23(26)25(27)12-13-28(27,33-3)17-32-2/h4-7,14,16,23-25,31H,8-13,15,17H2,1-3H3/b29-16+/t23-,24+,25-,27-,28+/m0/s1; Key:GJMNAFGEUJBOCE-MEQIQULJSA-N

Asoprisnil (INN; developmental code name J-867) is a synthetic, steroidal selective progesterone receptor modulator that was under development by Schering and TAP Pharmaceutical Products for the treatment of uterine fibroids. In 2005, phase III clinical trials were discontinued due to endometrial changes in patients.

== See also ==
- Asoprisnil ecamate
- Mifepristone
- Ulipristal acetate
- Vilaprisan
