= C23H32O2 =

The molecular formula C_{23}H_{32}O_{2} (molar mass: 340.49 g/mol, exact mass: 340.24023) may refer to:

- Dimethisterone, a pregnane
- Medrogestone
- Regonyl
