= John McLean Morris =

American physician (1914–1993)

John M. Morris
- Born: September 1, 1914; Kuling, China
- Died: April 8, 1993 (aged 81); Woodbridge, Connecticut
- Education: Princeton University; Harvard Medical School
- Spouse: Marjorie "Mimi" Austin Morris
- Scientific career
- Fields: Gynaecology
- Workplaces: Yale School of Medicine, Yale-New Haven Medical Center

John McLean Morris (September 1, 1914 – April 8, 1993) was an American gynecologist, surgeon and researcher.

== Early life ==
Morris was born on September 1, 1914, in Kuling, China, where his father, DuBois S. Morris, was a Presbyterian missionary. He later recalled being affected by the widespread infanticide of baby girls, saying "Unwanted female infants were disposed of by throwing them through a small hole in one of the dozens of stone huts erected for the purpose around the countryside." The family returned to the United States where Morris attended the preparatory Hotchkiss School in Lakeville, Connecticut.

Morris majored in biology at Princeton University where he was a member of the Cap and Gown Club and the managing editor of The Daily Princetonian. He graduated in 1936 and went on to Harvard Medical School, graduating in 1940.

During World War II, Morris served in the Medical Corps of the Navy, serving as a lieutenant commander for four years.

== Career ==
In 1953, Morris provided the first full description of what he called "testicular feminization syndrome" (also known as Morris's Syndrome) based on 82 cases compiled from the medical literature, including two of his own patients. The term "testicular feminization" was coined to reflect Morris' observation that the testicles in these patients produced a hormone that had a feminizing effect on the body, a phenomenon that is now understood to be due to the inaction of androgens, and subsequent aromatization of testosterone into estrogen.

Morris and Gertrude Van Wagenen are considered the "discoverers" of morning-after contraception, working first with DES to prevent pregnancy. Van Wagenen and Morris reported their success with human subjects at the 1966 annual meeting of the American Fertility Society.

Morris was the chief of gynecology and professor at Yale-New Haven Medical Center and Yale School of Medicine for 35 years. He also developed intrauterine devices.

Morris retired in 1987

== Personal life ==
He married Marjorie Austin Morris on February 14, 1950, in Short Hills, New Jersey. Morris died from prostate cancer on April 8, 1993, at his home in Woodbridge, Connecticut.
