= Vilaprisan =

Chemical compound

Clinical data
- Other names: BAY-1002670; 17β-Hydroxy-11β-[4-(methylsulfonyl)phenyl]-17α-(1,1,2,2,2-pentafluoroethyl)estra-4,9-dien-3-one
- Routes of administration: By mouth
- Drug class: Selective progesterone receptor modulator

Identifiers
- IUPAC name: (8S,11R,13S,14S,17S)-17-Hydroxy-13-methyl-11-(4-methylsulfonylphenyl)-17-(1,1,2,2,2-pentafluoroethyl)-1,2,6,7,8,11,12,14,15,16-decahydrocyclopenta[a]phenanthren-3-one
- CAS Number: 1262108-14-4
- PubChem CID: 50915138
- ChemSpider: 32699892
- UNII: IN59K53GI9
- KEGG: D11181
- CompTox Dashboard (EPA): DTXSID201110777

Chemical and physical data
- Formula: C_{27}H_{29}F_{5}O_{4}S
- Molar mass: 544.58 g·mol^{−1}
- 3D model (JSmol): Interactive image
- SMILES: C[C@]12C[C@@H](C3=C4CCC(=O)C=C4CC[C@H]3[C@@H]1CC[C@]2(C(C(F)(F)F)(F)F)O)C5=CC=C(C=C5)S(=O)(=O)C
- InChI: InChI=1S/C27H29F5O4S/c1-24-14-21(15-3-7-18(8-4-15)37(2,35)36)23-19-10-6-17(33)13-16(19)5-9-20(23)22(24)11-12-25(24,34)26(28,29)27(30,31)32/h3-4,7-8,13,20-22,34H,5-6,9-12,14H2,1-2H3/t20-,21+,22-,24-,25-/m0/s1; Key:JUFWQQVHQFDUOD-ANRPBIDPSA-N

Vilaprisan (INN, USAN) (developmental code name BAY-1002670) is a synthetic and steroidal selective progesterone receptor modulator (SPRM) which is under development by Bayer HealthCare Pharmaceuticals for the treatment of endometriosis and uterine fibroids. It is a potent and highly selective partial agonist of the progesterone receptor (PR). As of 2017, the drug is in phase II clinical trials for the aforementioned indications.

== See also ==
- List of investigational sex-hormonal agents § Progestogenics
- Lonaprisan
- Mifepristone
- Onapristone
- Ulipristal acetate
