= Lilopristone =

Chemical compound

Clinical data
- Other names: ZK-98734; ZK-734; 11β-(4-(Dimethylamino)phenyl)-17β-hydroxy-17α-((Z)-3-hydroxypropenyl)estra-4,9-dien-3-one

Identifiers
- IUPAC name: (8S,11R,13S,14S,17R)-11-[4-(dimethylamino)phenyl]-17-hydroxy-17-[(Z)-3-hydroxyprop-1-enyl]-13-methyl-1,2,6,7,8,11,12,14,15,16-decahydrocyclopenta[a]phenanthren-3-one
- CAS Number: 97747-88-1
- PubChem CID: 13490845
- ChemSpider: 11644476
- UNII: 3GL26H7N6T
- ChEMBL: ChEMBL1908329
- CompTox Dashboard (EPA): DTXSID801034575

Chemical and physical data
- Formula: C_{29}H_{37}NO_{3}
- Molar mass: 447.619 g·mol^{−1}
- 3D model (JSmol): Interactive image
- SMILES: C[C@]12C[C@@H](C3=C4CCC(=O)C=C4CC[C@H]3[C@@H]1CC[C@]2(/C=C\CO)O)C5=CC=C(C=C5)N(C)C
- InChI: InChI=1S/C29H37NO3/c1-28-18-25(19-5-8-21(9-6-19)30(2)3)27-23-12-10-22(32)17-20(23)7-11-24(27)26(28)13-15-29(28,33)14-4-16-31/h4-6,8-9,14,17,24-26,31,33H,7,10-13,15-16,18H2,1-3H3/b14-4-/t24-,25+,26-,28-,29-/m0/s1; Key:RCOWGILQXUPXEW-FUSOFXSQSA-N

Lilopristone (INN; development codes ZK-98734 and ZK-734) is a synthetic, steroidal antiprogestogen with additional antiglucocorticoid activity which was developed by Schering and was patented in 1985. It is described as an abortifacient and endometrial contraceptive. The drug differs from mifepristone only in the structure of its C17α side chain, and is said to have much reduced antiglucocorticoid activity in comparison.

== See also ==
- Aglepristone
- Onapristone
- Telapristone
- Toripristone
