= KLF9 =

Protein-coding gene in the species Homo sapiens

Identifiers
- Aliases: KLF9, BTEB, BTEB1, Kruppel-like factor 9, Kruppel like factor 9
- External IDs: OMIM: 602902; MGI: 1333856; GeneCards: KLF9

Gene location (Human)
Chr.	Chromosome 9 (human)
Band	9q21.12	Start	70,384,604 bp
Band	9q21.12	End	70,414,657 bp

Gene location (Mouse)
Chr.	Chromosome 19 (mouse)
Band	19|19 B	Start	23,118,590 bp
Band	19|19 B	End	23,145,498 bp
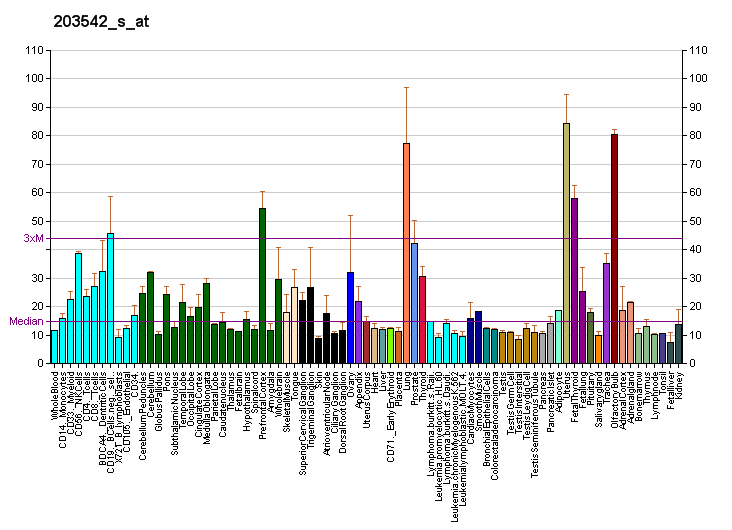

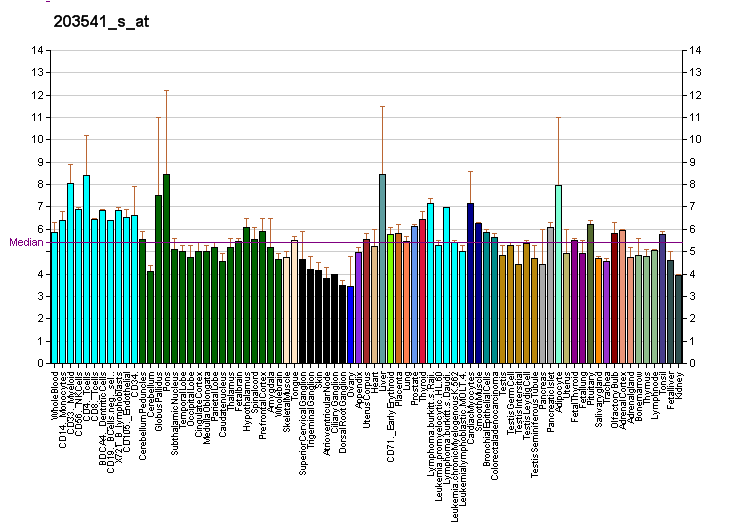

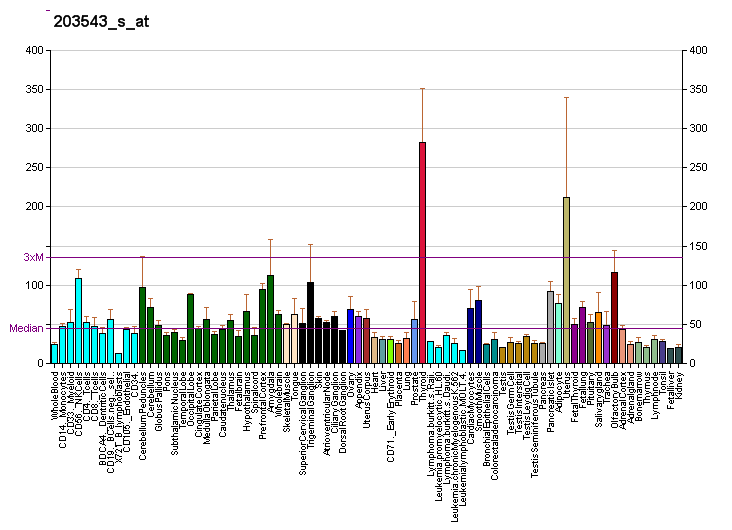
RNA expression pattern
Bgee	Human / Mouse (ortholog); Top expressed in: Achilles tendon; paraflocculus of cerebellum; buccal mucosa cell; lower lobe of lung; right lung; gastric mucosa; synovial joint; cerebellar vermis; tibial arteries; tibial nerve / Top expressed in: motor neuron; Epithelium of choroid plexus; Paneth cell; vestibular membrane of cochlear duct; retinal pigment epithelium; iris; lacrimal gland; Rostral migratory stream; ciliary body; dorsal striatum; More reference expression data
BioGPS	More reference expression data
Gene ontology
Molecular function	DNA-binding transcription factor activity; DNA binding; metal ion binding; nucleic acid binding; DNA-binding transcription factor activity, RNA polymerase II-specific
Cellular component	plasma membrane; nucleus; nucleoplasm; cytosol
Biological process	regulation of transcription by RNA polymerase II; cellular response to cortisol stimulus; regulation of transcription, DNA-templated; circadian rhythm; negative regulation of keratinocyte proliferation; transcription, DNA-templated; cellular response to thyroid hormone stimulus; rhythmic process
Sources:Amigo / QuickGO
Orthologs
Databases	NCBI: entry; OMA: entry
Species	Human	Mouse
Entrez	687	16601
Ensembl	ENSG00000119138	ENSMUSG00000033863
UniProt	Q13886	O35739; Q8CEC4
RefSeq (mRNA)	NM_001206	NM_010638
RefSeq (protein)	NP_001197	NP_034768
Location (UCSC)	Chr 9: 70.38 – 70.41 Mb	Chr 19: 23.12 – 23.15 Mb
PubMed search
- Wikidata
View/Edit Human	View/Edit Mouse

Krueppel-like factor 9 is a protein that in humans is encoded by the KLF9 gene. Previously known as Basic Transcription Element Binding Protein 1 (BTEB Protein 1), Klf9 is part of the Sp1 Cys_{2}His_{2}-type zinc finger family of transcription factors. Several previous studies showed Klf9-related regulation of animal development, including cell differentiation of B cells, keratinocytes, and neurons. Klf9 is also a key transcriptional regulator for uterine endometrial cell proliferation, adhesion, and differentiation, all factors that are essential during the process of pregnancy and are turned off during tumorigenesis.

== Function ==
The protein encoded by this gene is a transcription factor that binds to GC box elements located in the promoter. Binding of the encoded protein to a single GC box inhibits mRNA expression while binding to tandemly repeated GC box elements activates transcription.

Oxidative stress increases expression of Klf9 and overexpression of Klf9 gene sensitizes the cell to oxidative stress and reactive oxygen species (ROS).

Using a short hairpin RNA (shRNA) to silence expression of Klf9 provides resistance for the cell to oxidative stress and ROS-related cell death. Klf9 is upregulated by ROS and promotes ROS-related cell death.

Klf9 exhibits similarities to other known oxidative stress genes like NQO1 and HMOX1. When exposed to the same amount of hydrogen peroxide, both mouse embryo cells and human cells produced similar amounts of Klf9 and NQO1/HMOX. The opposite of this effect also occurs; Klf9 overexpression within the cell leads to an increase in intracellular ROS. The result of the increase in intracellular ROS and Klf9 is increase in cell death; with the overexpressed Klf9 gene, more cells die. Similar cell death was found in vivo when wild-type mice were exposed to oxidative stress agent paraquat intranasally, which validated the oxidative stress-dependent Klf9 expression found in just the cell lines.

Regions around 10 kb upstream and 1 kb downstream of Klf9 transcription start site contain conserved antioxidant response elements (AREs), which are binding sites for Nrf2. Nrf2 is a major regulator of the antioxidant response to ROS within the cell. Klf9 is upregulated by Nrf2; when oxidative stress is high and concentration of intracellular ROS is high, Nrf2 binds to Klf9 promoter, which increases the amount of intracellular ROS, leading to cell death. When oxidative stress is low, Nrf2 goes through its normal pathway by increasing the amount of antioxidant species within the cell and decreasing the amount of intracellular ROS.

== Animal studies ==
A Klf9 deficiency suppresses bleomycin-induced fibrosis in the lungs of mice. By introducing bleomycin to lung tissue, the tissue will produce ROS and develop fibrotic lung tissue to combat the damage done by the bleomycin. When Klf9 was knocked out in these mice, not as much fibrotic lung tissue was formed. Because of this finding, the researchers proposed that manipulations of Klf9 levels within the body may be a valid treatment for other diseases as well, including certain types of cancer.

== Interactions ==
KLF9 has been shown to interact with progesterone receptor.
