= Gertrude Van Wagenen =

American scientist

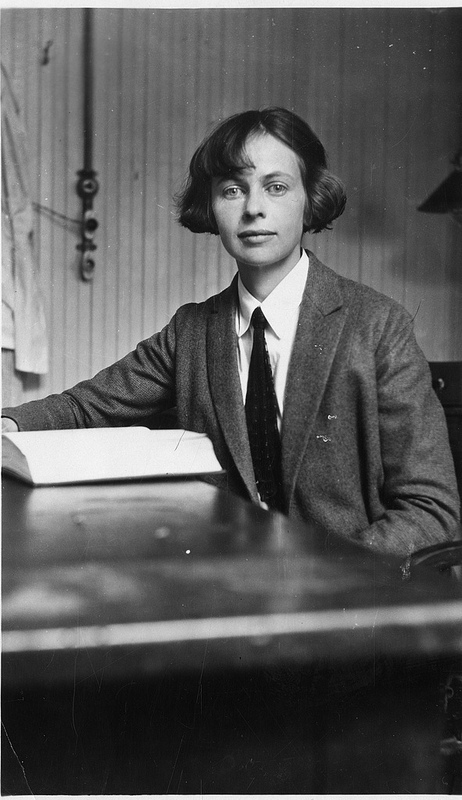
- Gertrude Van Wagenen, from the Science Service Records, Smithsonian Institution Archives.
- Born: 1893
- Died: February 8, 1978 (aged 86–87); New Haven, Connecticut
- Education: Iowa State University; University of Iowa
- Known for: Endocrinology
- Spouse: Crawford Fairbanks Failey MD
- Scientific career
- Fields: Biology
- Thesis: The Coral Mussa Fragilis and Its Development (1920)

Gertrude L. Van Wagenen (1893 – February 8, 1978) was an American biologist. She was also a collector of anatomical illustrations and models.

== Early life ==
Gertrude L. Van Wagenen was the daughter of Anthony Van Wagenen (1852–1937), a judge and lawyer in Sioux City, Iowa, and his wife Gertrude (née Louis). She completed undergraduate studies at Iowa State University in 1913, where she majored in zoology and was a member of the Beta Zeta chapter of the Kappa Kappa Gamma sorority. For a few years after graduating, she taught in Ottumwa, Iowa, and endured a case of scarlet fever, with the quarantine it required. In 1918, she collected corals, anemones, and medusae as part of the Barbados-Antigua Expedition, a group of University of Iowa graduate students and faculty studying the natural history of those islands. Her doctoral dissertation at the University of Iowa was titled The Coral Mussa Fragilis and Its Development.

== Research ==
Van Wagenen was associate professor and lecturer at Yale School of Medicine, where she did pioneering work in the field of reproductive endocrinology. In 1935, she established an influential early breeding colony of rhesus monkeys in Yale's Department of Obstetrics and Gynecology. Over more than four decades, Gertrude van Wagenen amassed birth-to-death data on 1261 monkeys, including 600 live births, covering fifteen generations. She and gynecologist John McLean Morris are considered the "discoverers" of morning-after contraception, working first with diethylstilbestrol (DES) to prevent pregnancy. Van Wagenen and Morris reported their successes with monkeys and with women, respectively, at the 1966 annual meeting of the American Fertility Society.

Her monographs included Embryology of the Ovary and Testis in Homo sapiens and Macaca mulatta (Yale University Press 1965), and Postnatal Development of the Ovary in Homo sapiens and Macaca mulatta and Induction of Ovulation in the Macaque (Yale University Press 1973, co-authored with Miriam E. Simpson).

== Personal life ==
Gertrude Van Wagenen married Crawford Fairbanks Failey, M.D. (1900–1981); her husband had inherited wealth, which allowed her to travel. In addition to her research, Van Wagenen enjoyed traveling and collecting medical illustrations and objects, including engravings, textbooks, models, and mannequins. She was also interested in art and cultural depictions of monkeys. On a trip to Japan in 1957, she found a book, Junichiro Itani's Japanese Monkeys in Takasakiyama (1954). She sent it to a colleague, who in turn arranged for it to be translated and published in English. Van Wagenen died on February 8, 1978. Her collections were left to the Medical History Library at Yale.
