= Telapristone =

Chemical compound

Clinical data
- Other names: CDB-4124; Proellex; Progenta; 17β-(Acetyloxy)-11β-[4-(dimethylamino)phenyl]-17α-(2-methoxyacetyl)estra-4,9-dien-3-one
- Drug class: Selective progesterone receptor modulator

Legal status
- Legal status: Investigational

Identifiers
- IUPAC name: [(8S,11R,13S,14S,17R)-11-[4-(Dimethylamino)phenyl]-17-(2-methoxyacetyl)-13-methyl-3-oxo-1,2,6,7,8,11,12,14,15,16-decahydrocyclopenta[a]phenanthren-17-yl] acetate
- CAS Number: 198414-31-2
- PubChem CID: 9806190
- PubChem SID: 347910049
- DrugBank: DB05253
- ChemSpider: 7981950
- UNII: 1K9EYK92PQ
- KEGG: D09972
- ChEMBL: ChEMBL2105694
- CompTox Dashboard (EPA): DTXSID60173587

Chemical and physical data
- Formula: C_{31}H_{39}NO_{5}
- Molar mass: 505.655 g·mol^{−1}
- 3D model (JSmol): Interactive image
- SMILES: O=C5\C=C3/C(=C2/[C@@H](c1ccc(N(C)C)cc1)C[C@@]4([C@@](OC(=O)C)(C(=O)COC)CC[C@H]4[C@@H]2CC3)C)CC5
- InChI: InChI=1S/C31H39NO5/c1-19(33)37-31(28(35)18-36-5)15-14-27-25-12-8-21-16-23(34)11-13-24(21)29(25)26(17-30(27,31)2)20-6-9-22(10-7-20)32(3)4/h6-7,9-10,16,25-27H,8,11-15,17-18H2,1-5H3/t25-,26+,27-,30-,31-/m0/s1; Key:JVBGZFRPTRKSBB-MJBQOYBXSA-N

Telapristone (INN), as telapristone acetate (proposed brand names Proellex, Progenta; former code name CDB-4124), is a synthetic, steroidal selective progesterone receptor modulator (SPRM) related to mifepristone which is under development by Repros Therapeutics for the treatment of breast cancer, endometriosis, and uterine fibroids. It was originally developed by the National Institutes of Health (NIH), and, as of 2017, is in phase II clinical trials for the aforementioned indications. In addition to its activity as an SPRM, the drug also has some antiglucocorticoid activity.

== See also ==
- List of investigational sex-hormonal agents § Progestogenics
- Aglepristone
- Lilopristone
- Onapristone
- Toripristone
