= Antiprogestogen =

Class of compounds

- Drug class
- Mifepristone, an antiprogestogen that is used to induce medical abortions.

Class identifiers
- Synonyms: Antiprogestins; Progesterone antagonists; Progesterone blockers
- Use: Medical abortion, emergency contraception, uterine fibroids
- ATC code: G03XB
- Biological target: Progesterone receptor
- Chemical class: Steroidal

Legal status

Antiprogestogens or antiprogestins, also known as progesterone antagonists or progesterone blockers, are a class of drugs which prevent progestogens like progesterone from mediating their biological effects in the body. These drugs competitively inhibit progestin at progesterone receptors, acting by blocking the progesterone receptor (PR) and/or inhibiting or suppressing progestogen production. Antiprogestogens are one of three types of sex hormone antagonists, alongside antiestrogens and antiandrogens.

== Clinical applications ==
Antiprogestogens are used as abortifacients, emergency contraceptives, and in the treatment of uterine fibroids. They are also being studied in the treatment of breast cancer. Examples include the progesterone receptor weak partial agonist mifepristone, the selective progesterone receptor modulator (SPRM) ulipristal acetate, and the silent antagonist aglepristone. In medical abortion, mifepristone is combined with a prostaglandin (e.g., gemeprost), while ulipristal is used for emergency contraception.

== Development and approval ==
Several hundred antiprogestogens have been developed, but only three—mifepristone, lilopristone, and onapristone—have been administered to humans. Of these, only mifepristone has been approved and introduced for clinical use.

== Role and mechanism of action ==
Progestins, including progesterone, are vital for preparing the uterus for the implantation of a fertilized egg during the luteal phase of the menstrual cycle. If fertilization, implantation, and other events necessary for pregnancy occur, increased progestin (i.e., progesterone) levels are essential in maintaining the pregnancy. Blocking the effects of progestins like progesterone is associated with anti-gestational effects, resulting in the interruption of pregnancy maintenance.

== See also ==
- Antiestrogen
- Antiandrogen
