= Onapristone =

Chemical compound

Clinical data
- Other names: ZK-89299; ZK-299; AR-18; IVV-1001; 11β-(4-(Dimethylamino)phenyl)-17α-hydroxy-17β-(3-hydroxypropyl)-13α-estra-4,9-dien-3-one
- Drug class: Antiprogestogen

Identifiers
- IUPAC name: (8S,11R,13R,14S,17S)-11-[4-(Dimethylamino)phenyl]-17-hydroxy-17-(3-hydroxypropyl)-13-methyl-1,2,6,7,8,11,12,14,15,16-decahydrocyclopenta[a]phenanthren-3-one
- CAS Number: 96346-61-1
- PubChem CID: 5311505
- ChemSpider: 4470982
- UNII: H6H7G23O3N
- KEGG: D09571
- ChEMBL: ChEMBL1908373
- CompTox Dashboard (EPA): DTXSID90242210
- ECHA InfoCard: 100.233.493

Chemical and physical data
- Formula: C_{29}H_{39}NO_{3}
- Molar mass: 449.635 g·mol^{−1}
- 3D model (JSmol): Interactive image
- SMILES: C[C@@]12C[C@@H](C3=C4CCC(=O)C=C4CC[C@H]3[C@@H]1CC[C@@]2(CCCO)O)C5=CC=C(C=C5)N(C)C
- InChI: InChI=1S/C29H39NO3/c1-28-18-25(19-5-8-21(9-6-19)30(2)3)27-23-12-10-22(32)17-20(23)7-11-24(27)26(28)13-15-29(28,33)14-4-16-31/h5-6,8-9,17,24-26,31,33H,4,7,10-16,18H2,1-3H3/t24-,25+,26-,28+,29+/m0/s1; Key:IEXUMDBQLIVNHZ-YOUGDJEHSA-N

Onapristone (INN) (developmental code names ZK-89299, ZK-299) is a synthetic and steroidal antiprogestogen with additional antiglucocorticoid activity which was developed by Schering and described in 1984 but was never marketed. It is a silent antagonist of the progesterone receptor (PR), in contrast to the related antiprogestogen mifepristone (which is a weak partial agonist of the receptor). Moreover, compared to mifepristone, onapristone has reduced antiglucocorticoid activity, shows little antiandrogenic activity, and has 10- to 30-fold greater potency as an antiprogestogen. The medication was under development for clinical use, for instance in the treatment of breast cancer and as an endometrial contraceptive, but was discontinued during phase III clinical trials in 1995 due to findings that liver function abnormalities developed in a majority patients.

Onapristone has been found to be effective in the treatment of breast cancer.

As of 2016, onapristone has re-emerged and is under development for the treatment of prostate cancer, currently in phase II clinical trials. It was also under development for the treatment of endometrial cancer, breast cancer, ovarian cancer, and uterine cancer, but was discontinued for these indications in favor of focusing on prostate cancer.

== Chemistry ==
=== Synthesis ===
The chemical synthesis has been described: Dof: Photoconversion patent:

The more modern Chinese work starts from dienedione starting material: The name of the precursor goes by the trivial name of Ethylene deltenone [5571-36-8].

The conjugate addition reaction between PC10992393 (1) and 4-(n,n-Dimethyl)anilinemagnesium bromide [7353-91-5] (2) gives (3). Oxidation of the 17C alcohol group to a ketone gives [93748-54-0] (4). Irradiation for 16 minutes with a mercury lamp resulted in inversion of the methyl group from the beta to the alpha configuration, PC13371204 (5). Alkynylation with Tetrahydro-2-(2-propynyloxy)-2H-pyran [6089-04-9] (6) in the presence of butyl lithium gave (7). Catalytic hydrogenation then saturated the alkyne group whilst leaving the two olefins unperturbed. Acid removal of the cyclic ketal protecting group then completed the synthesis of onapristone (8).

== See also ==
- List of investigational sex-hormonal agents § Progestogenics
- Aglepristone
- Lilopristone
- Telapristone
- Toripristone
