= Emergency contraception =

Birth control measures taken after sexual intercourse

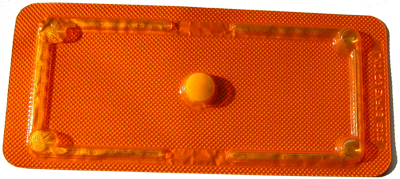
- An emergency contraception pill

Background
- Type: Hormonal (progestin or others) or intrauterine
- First use: 1970s
- Synonyms: Emergency postcoital contraception

Failure rates (per use)
- Perfect use: ECP: see article text IUD: under 1%
- Typical use: % (please see Effectiveness of ECPs below)

Usage
- User reminders: Pregnancy test required if no period seen after 3 weeks
- Clinic review: Consider need for STI screening and ongoing birth control needs

Advantages and disadvantages
- STI protection: No
- Periods: ECP may disrupt next menstrual period by a couple of days. IUDs may make menstruation heavier and more painful
- Benefits: IUDs may be subsequently left in place for ongoing contraception
- Risks: As per methods

Medical notes
- Use as soon as possible.; Copper IUD within 5 to 10 days; Ulipristal acetate or mifepristone pill within 5 days; Levonorgestrel pill within 3 days; Yuzpe regimen (combined estrogen/progestin pills at higher doses) is no longer recommended unless other options are not available

Emergency contraception (EC) is a birth control measure, used after sexual intercourse to prevent pregnancy.

There are different forms of EC. Emergency contraceptive pills (ECPs), sometimes simply referred to as emergency contraceptives (ECs), or the morning-after pill, are medications intended to disrupt or delay ovulation or fertilization, which are necessary for pregnancy.

Intrauterine devices (IUDs) – usually used as a primary contraceptive method – are sometimes used as the most effective form of emergency contraception. However, the use of IUDs for emergency contraception is relatively rare.

== Definition ==
Emergency contraception is a birth control measure taken to reduce the risk of pregnancy following unprotected sexual intercourse or when other regular contraceptive measures have not worked properly or have not been used correctly. It is intended to be used occasionally and is not the same as medical abortion. Emergency contraception is offered to women who do not wish to conceive but have had unprotected sex on any day of the menstrual cycle, from day 21 after giving birth, or from day five after abortion or miscarriage. Emergency contraception measures include tablets taken by mouth or the insertion of a copper intrauterine device.

Emergency contraception is not related to medical abortion, which is a drug regimen administered to terminate pregnancies in any trimester.

== Emergency contraceptive pills ==
Emergency contraceptive pills (ECPs) are sometimes referred to as emergency hormonal contraception (EHC). They are taken after unprotected sexual intercourse or the breakage of a condom.

=== Types ===
A variety of emergency contraceptive pills are available, including combined estrogen and progestin pills; progestin-only (levonorgestrel, LNG) pills; and antiprogestin (ulipristal acetate or mifepristone) pills. Progestin-only and anti-progestin pills are available as specifically packaged pills for use as emergency contraceptive pills. Emergency contraceptive pills originally contained higher doses of the same hormones (estrogens, progestins, or both) found in regular combined oral contraceptive pills. Combined estrogen and progestin pills are no longer recommended as dedicated emergency contraceptive pills (because this regimen is less effective and caused more nausea), but certain regular combined oral contraceptive pills (taken 2–5 at a time in what was called "the Yuzpe regimen") have also been shown to be effective as emergency contraceptive pills.

Progestin-only emergency contraceptive pills contain levonorgestrel, either as a single tablet (or historically, as a split dose of two tablets taken 12 hours apart), effective up to 72 hours after intercourse. Progestin-only ECPs are sold under many different brand names. Progestin-only ECPs are available over-the-counter (OTC) in many countries (e.g. Australia, Bangladesh, Bulgaria, Canada, Cyprus, Czech Republic, Denmark, Estonia, India, Malta, Netherlands, Norway, Portugal, Romania, Slovakia, South Africa, Sweden, United States), from a pharmacist without a prescription, and available with a prescription in some other countries.

The antiprogestin ulipristal acetate is available as a micronized emergency contraceptive tablet, effective up to 120 hours after intercourse. Ulipristal acetate ECPs developed by HRA Pharma are available over the counter in Europe and by prescription in over 50 countries under the brand names ellaOne, ella (marketed by Watson Pharmaceuticals in the United States), Duprisal 30, Ulipristal 30, and UPRIS.

The antiprogestin mifepristone (also known as RU-486) is available in five countries as a low-dose or mid-dose emergency contraceptive tablet, effective up to 120 hours after intercourse. Low-dose mifepristone ECPs are available by prescription in Armenia, Russia, Ukraine, and Vietnam and from a pharmacist without a prescription in China. Mid-dose mifepristone ECPs are available by prescription in China and Vietnam.

Combined estrogen (ethinylestradiol) and progestin (levonorgestrel or norgestrel) pills used to be available as dedicated emergency contraceptive pills under several brand names: Schering PC4, Tetragynon, Neoprimavlar, and Preven (in the United States) but were withdrawn after more effective dedicated progestin-only (levonorgestrel) emergency contraceptive pills with fewer side effects became available. If other more effective dedicated emergency contraceptive pills (levonorgestrel, ulipristal acetate, or mifepristone) are not available, specific combinations of regular combined oral contraceptive pills can be taken in split doses 12 hours apart (the Yuzpe regimen), effective up to 72 hours after intercourse.

The U.S. Food and Drug Administration (FDA) approved this off-label use of certain brands of regular combined oral contraceptive pills in 1997. As of 2014, there are 26 brands of regular combined oral contraceptive pills containing levonorgestrel or norgestrel available in the United States that can be used in the emergency contraceptive Yuzpe regimen, when none of the more effective and better-tolerated options are available.

=== Effectiveness ===
Ulipristal acetate, and mid-dose mifepristone are both more effective than levonorgestrel, which is more effective than the Yuzpe method.

The effectiveness of emergency contraception is expressed as a percentage reduction in pregnancy rate for a single use of EC. Using an example of "75% effective", the effectiveness calculation thus:

... these numbers do not translate into a pregnancy rate of 25 percent. Rather, they mean that if 1,000 women have unprotected intercourse in the middle two weeks of their menstrual cycles, approximately 80 will become pregnant. Use of emergency contraceptive pills would reduce this number by 75 percent, to 20 women.

The progestin-only regimen (using levonorgestrel) has an 89% effectiveness. As of 2006, the labeling on the U.S. brand Plan B explained this effectiveness rate by stating, "Seven out of every eight women who would have gotten pregnant will not become pregnant."

In 1999, a meta-analysis of eight studies of the combined (Yuzpe) regimen concluded that the best point estimate of effectiveness was 74%. A 2003 analysis of two of the largest combined (Yuzpe) regimen studies, using a different calculation method, found effectiveness estimates of 47% and 53%.

For both the progestin-only and Yuzpe regimens, the effectiveness of emergency contraception is highest when taken within 12 hours of intercourse and declines over time. The World Health Organization (WHO) suggested that reasonable effectiveness may continue for up to 120 hours (5 days) after intercourse.

For 10 mg of mifepristone taken up to 120 hours (5 days) after intercourse, the combined estimate from three trials was an effectiveness of 83%. A review found that a moderate dose of mifepristone is better than LNG or Yuzpe, with delayed return of menstruation being the main adverse effect of most regimes.

HRA Pharma changed its packaging information for Norlevo (levonorgestrel 1.5 mg, which is identical to many other EHCs) in November 2013 warning that according to studies the drug loses effectiveness in women who weigh more than 75 kg (165 lb) and is completely ineffective for women who weigh over 80 kg (176 lb). After a review by European Medicines Agency, the statement was deleted from the leaflet. The agency communicated that levonorgestrel is safe and effective method of emergency contraception, regardless of body weight.

=== Safety ===
The most common side effect reported by users of emergency contraceptive pills was nausea, reported by 14 to 23% of levonorgestrel-only users and 50.5% of Yuzpe regimen users. Vomiting is much less common and unusual with levonorgestrel-only ECPs (5.6% of levonorgestrel-only users vs 18.8% of 979 Yuzpe regimen users in 1998 WHO trial; 1.4% of 2,720 levonorgestrel-only users in the 2002 WHO trial). Anti-emetics are not routinely recommended with levonorgestrel-only ECPs. If a woman vomits within 2 hours of taking a levonorgestrel-only ECP, she should take a further dose as soon as possible.

Other common side effects (each reported by less than 20% of levonorgestrel-only users in both the 1998 and 2002 WHO trials) were abdominal pain, fatigue, headache, dizziness, and breast tenderness. Side effects generally resolve within 24 hours, although temporary disruption of the menstrual cycle is commonly experienced. If taken before ovulation, the high doses of progestogen in levonorgestrel treatments may induce progestogen withdrawal bleeding a few days after the pills are taken.

One study found that about half of women who used levonorgestrel ECPs experienced bleeding within 7 days of taking the pills. If levonorgestrel is taken after ovulation, it may increase the length of the luteal phase, thus delaying menstruation by a few days. Mifepristone, if taken before ovulation, may delay ovulation by 3–4 days (delayed ovulation may result in a delayed menstruation). These disruptions only occur in the cycle in which ECPs were taken; subsequent cycle length is not significantly affected. If a woman's menstrual period is delayed by two weeks or more, it is advised that she take a pregnancy test. (Earlier testing may not give accurate results.)

Existing pregnancy is not a contraindication in terms of safety, as there is no known harm to the woman, the course of her pregnancy, or the fetus if progestin-only or combined emergency contraception pills are accidentally used, but EC is not indicated for a woman with a known or suspected pregnancy because it is not effective in women who are already pregnant.

The World Health Organization (WHO) lists no medical condition for which the risks of emergency contraceptive pills outweigh the benefits. The American Academy of Pediatrics (AAP) and experts on emergency contraception have concluded that progestin-only ECPs are preferable to combined ECPs containing estrogen for all women, and particularly those with a history of blood clots, stroke, or migraine.

There are no medical conditions in which progestin-only ECPs are contraindicated. Current venous thromboembolism, current or history of breast cancer, inflammatory bowel disease, and acute intermittent porphyria are conditions where the advantages of using emergency contraceptive pills generally outweigh the theoretical or proven risks.

ECPs, like all other contraceptives, reduce the absolute risk of ectopic pregnancy by preventing pregnancies and there is no increase in the relative risk of ectopic pregnancy in women who become pregnant after using progestin-only ECPs.

== Interactions ==
The herbal preparation of St John's wort and some enzyme-inducing drugs (e.g. anticonvulsants or rifampicin) may reduce the effectiveness of ECP, and a larger dose may be required, especially in women who weigh more than 165 lbs.

== Intrauterine device ==
An effective emergency contraception measure is the copper-T intrauterine device (IUD) which is generally recommended up to 5 days after unprotected intercourse or up to 5 days after probable ovulation. Some studies have found it to be effective up to 10 days after unprotected intercourse to prevent pregnancy. A 2021 study found that the hormonal IUD was as effective at emergency contraception as the copper IUD, though it is not offered by clinicians at the moment due to the lack of research done into the subject.

Insertion of an IUD is more effective than the use of emergency contraceptive pills – pregnancy rates when used as emergency contraception are the same as with normal IUD use. Unlike emergency contraceptive pills, which work by delaying ovulation, the copper-T IUD works by interfering with sperm motility. Therefore, the copper IUD is equally effective as emergency contraception at all weight ranges. IUDs may be left in place following the subsequent menstruation to provide ongoing contraception for as long as desired (12+ years).

== As regular contraception ==
One brand of levonorgestrel pills was marketed as an ongoing method of postcoital contraception. However, with typical use, failure rates are expected to be higher than with the use of other birth control methods.

Like all hormonal methods, postcoital high-dose progestin-only oral contraceptive pills do not protect against sexually transmitted infections.

ECPs are generally recommended for backup or "emergency" use – for example, if a woman has forgotten to take a birth control pill or when a condom is torn during sex. However, for women facing reproductive coercion, who are not able to use regular birth control, repeated use of EC pills may be the most viable option available.

== High-risk sex and abortion ==
Making ECPs more widely available does not increase sexual risk-taking. While they are effective for individuals who use them in a timely fashion, the availability of EC pills does not appear to decrease abortion rates at the population level.

In 2012 the American Academy of Pediatrics (AAP) stated: "Despite multiple studies showing no increased risk behaviour and evidence that hormonal emergency contraception will not disrupt an established pregnancy, public and medical discourse reflects that personal values of physicians and pharmacists continue to affect emergency-contraception access, particularly for adolescents."

== EC and sexual assault ==
Beginning in the 1960s, women who had been sexually assaulted were offered diethylstilbestrol (DES). Currently, the standard of care is to offer ulipristal or prompt placement of a copper IUD which is the most effective form of EC. However, adherence to these best practices varies by the emergency department. Before these EC options were available (in 1996), pregnancy rates among females of child-bearing age who had been raped were around 5%. Although EC is recommended following sexual assault, room for improvement in clinical practice remains.

== Mechanism of action ==
The primary mechanism of action of progestin-only emergency contraceptive pills is to prevent fertilization by inhibition of ovulation. The best available evidence is that they do not have any post-fertilization effects such as the prevention of implantation. The U.S. FDA-approved labels and European EMA-approved labels (except for HRA Pharma's NorLevo) levonorgestrel emergency contraceptive pills (based on labels for regular oral contraceptive pills) say they may cause endometrial changes that discourage implantation. Daily use of regular oral contraceptive pills can alter the endometrium (although this has not been proven to interfere with implantation), but the isolated use of a levonorgestrel emergency contraceptive pill does not have time to alter the endometrium.

In March 2011, the International Federation of Gynecology and Obstetrics (FIGO) issued a statement that: "review of the evidence suggests that LNG [levonorgestreol] ECPs cannot prevent implantation of a fertilized egg. Language on implantation should not be included in LNG ECP product labeling." In June 2012, a New York Times editorial called on the FDA to remove from the label the unsupported suggestion that levonorgestrel emergency contraceptive pills inhibit implantation. In November 2013, the European Medicines Agency (EMA) approved a change to the label for HRA Pharma's NorLevo saying it cannot prevent implantation of a fertilized egg.

Progestogen-only emergency contraceptive does not appear to affect the function of the fallopian tubes or increase the rate of ectopic pregnancies.

The primary mechanism of action of progesterone receptor modulator emergency contraceptive pills like low-dose and mid-dose mifepristone and ulipristal acetate is to prevent fertilization by inhibition or delay of ovulation. One clinical study found that post-ovulatory administration of ulipristal acetate altered the endometrium, but whether the changes would inhibit implantation is unknown. The European EMA-approved labels for ulipristal acetate emergency contraceptive pills do not mention an effect on implantation, but the U.S. FDA-approved label says: "alterations to the endometrium that may affect implantation may also contribute to efficacy."

The primary mechanism of action of copper-releasing intrauterine devices (IUDs) as emergency contraceptives is to prevent fertilization because of copper toxicity to sperm and ova. The very high effectiveness of copper-releasing IUDs as emergency contraceptives implies that they must also prevent some pregnancies by post-fertilization effects such as prevention of implantation.

== History ==
In 1966, gynecologist John McLean Morris and biologist Gertrude Van Wagenen at the Yale School of Medicine, reported the successful use of oral high-dose estrogen pills as post-coital contraceptives in women and rhesus macaque monkeys, respectively. A few different drugs were studied, with a focus on high-dose estrogens, and it was originally hoped that postcoital contraception would prove viable as an ongoing contraceptive method.

The first widely used methods were five-day treatments with high-dose estrogens, using diethylstilbestrol (DES) in the US and ethinylestradiol in the Netherlands by Haspels.

In the early 1970s, the Yuzpe regimen was developed by A. Albert Yuzpe in 1974; progestin-only postcoital contraception was investigated (1975); and the copper IUD was first studied for use as emergency contraception (1975). Danazol was tested in the early 1980s in the hopes that it would have fewer side effects than Yuzpe, but was found to be ineffective.

The Yuzpe regimen became the standard course of treatment for postcoital contraception in many countries in the 1980s. The first prescription-only combined estrogen-progestin dedicated product, Schering PC4 (ethinylestradiol and norgestrel), was approved in the UK in January 1984 and first marketed in October 1984. Schering introduced a second prescription-only combined product, Tetragynon (ethinylestradiol and levonorgestrel) in Germany in 1985. By 1997, Schering AG dedicated prescription-only combined products had been approved in only 9 countries: the UK (Schering PC4), New Zealand (Schering PC4), South Africa (E-Gen-C), Germany (Tetragynon), Switzerland (Tetragynon), Denmark (Tetragynon), Norway (Tetragynon), Sweden (Tetragynon) and Finland (Neoprimavlar); and had been withdrawn from marketing in New Zealand in 1997 to prevent it being sold over-the-counter. Regular combined oral contraceptive pills (which were less expensive and more widely available) were more commonly used for the Yuzpe regimen even in countries where dedicated products were available.

Over time, interest in progestin-only treatments increased. The Special Program on Human Reproduction (HRP), an international organization whose members include the World Bank and World Health Organization, "played a pioneering role in emergency contraception" by "confirming the effectiveness of levonorgestrel." After the WHO conducted a large trial comparing Yuzpe and levonorgestrel in 1998, combined estrogen-progestin products were gradually withdrawn from some markets (Preven in the United States discontinued May 2004, Schering PC4 in the UK discontinued October 2001, and Tetragynon in France) in favor of progestin-only EC, although prescription-only dedicated Yuzpe regimen products are still available in some countries.

In 2002, China became the first country in which mifepristone was registered for use as EC.

In 2020, Japan announced it would consider easing regulations on the sale of emergency contraceptive pills without a prescription. Non-profit groups submitted a petition to the health ministry calling for prescription-free access to the pill. They had collected more than 100,000 signatures.

=== Calculating effectiveness ===
Early studies of emergency contraceptives did not attempt to calculate a failure rate; they simply reported the number of women who became pregnant after using an emergency contraceptive. Since 1980, clinical trials of emergency contraception have first calculated probable pregnancies in the study group if no treatment were given. The effectiveness is calculated by dividing observed pregnancies by the estimated number of pregnancies without treatment.

Placebo-controlled trials that could give a precise measure of the pregnancy rate without treatment would be unethical, so the effectiveness percentage is based on estimated pregnancy rates. These are currently estimated using variants of the calendar method. Women with irregular cycles for any reason (including recent hormone use such as oral contraceptives and breastfeeding) must be excluded from such calculations. Even for women included in the calculation, the limitations of calendar methods of fertility determination have long been recognized. In their February 2014 emergency review article, Trussell and Raymond note:

Calculation of effectiveness, and particularly the denominator of the fraction, involves many assumptions that are difficult to validate. The risk of pregnancy for women requesting ECPs appears to be lower than assumed in the estimates of ECP efficacy, which are consequently likely to be overestimates. Yet, precise estimates of efficacy may not be highly relevant to many women who have had unprotected intercourse, since ECPs are often the only available treatment.

In 1999, hormonal assay was suggested as a more accurate method of estimating fertility for EC studies.

=== United States ===
==== DES ====
- In 1971, a New England Journal of Medicine editorial calling attention to previously published studies on the use of DES as a postcoital contraceptive at Yale University, and a large study published in JAMA on the use of DES as a postcoital contraceptive at the University of Michigan, led to off-label use of DES as a postcoital contraceptive becoming prevalent at many university health services.
- In May 1973, in an attempt to restrict off-label use of DES as a postcoital contraceptive to emergency situations such as rape, a FDA Drug Bulletin was sent to all U.S. physicians and pharmacists that said the FDA had approved, under restricted conditions, postcoital contraceptive use of DES. (In February 1975, the FDA Commissioner testified that the only error in the May 1973 FDA Drug Bulletin was that the FDA had not approved postcoital contraceptive use of DES).
- In September 1973, the FDA published a proposed rule specifying patient labeling and special packaging requirements for any manufacturer seeking FDA approval to market DES as a postcoital contraceptive, inviting manufacturers to submit abbreviated new drug applications (ANDAs) for that indication, and notifying manufacturers that the FDA intended to order the withdrawal of DES 25 mg tablets (which were being used off-label as postcoital contraceptives).
- In late 1973, Eli Lilly, the largest U.S. manufacturer of DES, discontinued its DES 25 mg tablets and in March 1974 sent a letter to all U.S. physicians and pharmacists telling them it did not recommend use of DES as a postcoital contraceptive.
- Only one pharmaceutical company, Tablicaps, Inc., a small manufacturer of generic drugs, ever submitted (in January 1974) an ANDA for use of DES as an emergency postcoital contraceptive, and the FDA never approved it.
- In February 1975, the FDA said it had not yet approved DES as a postcoital contraceptive, but would after March 8, 1975, permit marketing of DES for that indication in emergency situations such as rape or incest if a manufacturer obtained an approved ANDA that provided patient labeling and special packaging as set out in a FDA final rule published in February 1975. To discourage off-label use of DES as a postcoital contraceptive, in February 1975 the FDA ordered DES 25 mg (and higher) tablets removed from the market and ordered the labeling of lower doses (5 mg and lower) of DES still approved for other indications be changed to state: "THIS DRUG PRODUCT SHOULD not BE USED AS A POSTCOITAL CONTRACEPTIVE" in block capital letters on the first line of the physician prescribing information package insert and in a prominent and conspicuous location of the container and carton label.
- In March 1978, a FDA Drug Bulletin was sent to all U.S. physicians and pharmacists which said: "FDA has not yet given approval for any manufacturer to market DES as a postcoital contraceptive. The Agency, however, will approve this indication for emergency situations such as rape or incest if a manufacturer provides patient labeling and special packaging. To discourage 'morning after' use of DES without patient labeling, FDA has removed from the market the 25 mg tablets of DES, formerly used for this purpose."
- In the 1980s, off-label use of the Yuzpe regimen superseded off-label use of DES for postcoital contraception.
  - DES is no longer commercially available in the U.S.; Eli Lilly, the last U.S. manufacturer, ceased production in spring 1997.

==== Preven ====
- On February 25, 1997, the FDA posted a notice in the Federal Register saying it had concluded that the Yuzpe regimen was safe and effective for off-label use as postcoital EC, was prepared to accept NDAs for COCPs labeled as ECPs, and listed 6 then available COCPs (there are now 22) that could be used as ECPs.
- On September 1, 1998, the FDA approved the prescription Yuzpe regimen Preven Emergency Contraception Kit (which contained a urine pregnancy test and 4 COCPs). Preven was discontinued in May 2004.

==== Plan B ====
- On July 28, 1999, the FDA approved the prescription progestin-only Plan B (two 750 μg levonorgestrel pills) emergency contraceptive.
- On August 24, 2006, the FDA approved nonprescription behind-the-counter access to Plan B from pharmacies staffed by a licensed pharmacist for women 18 or older; a prescription-only form of Plan B was made available for younger females aged 17 and younger.
- On November 6, 2006, Barr Pharmaceuticals announced that its subsidiary, Duramed Pharmaceuticals, had initiated shipment of dual-label Plan B OTC/Rx and it would be available in pharmacies across the U.S. by mid-November 2006.
- On March 23, 2009, a US judge ordered the FDA to allow 17-year-olds to acquire Plan B without a prescription. This now changes the August 24, 2006, ruling and Plan B is now available "behind the counter" for men and women. There is a prescription method available for girls under 17.
- On April 30, 2013, the FDA approved (with three-year marketing exclusivity) Teva Pharmaceutical Industries' Plan B One-Step for sale without a prescription to anyone age 15 or over who can show proof of age such as a driver's license, birth certificate, or passport to a drug store retail clerk. Generic one-pill levonorgestrel emergency contraceptives and all two-pill levonorgestrel emergency contraceptives will remain restricted to sale from a pharmacist—without a prescription to anyone age 17 or over who can show proof of age.
- On June 10, 2013, the Obama administration ceased trying to block over-the-counter availability of the pill. With this reversal it means that any person is able to purchase the Plan B One-Step without a prescription.

== Availability ==
The COVID-19 pandemic in the United Kingdom was reported to have caused "significant disruption" to contraceptive services in the United Kingdom.

=== United States ===
After Roe v. Wade and Doe v. Bolton resulted in the U.S. Supreme Court's 1973 ruling to legalize abortion, both Federal and State laws were created to allow medical professionals and institutions the right to deny reproductive health services without financial, professional, or legal penalty. Roe v. Wade caused a historical survey to be conducted and concluded that right to privacy cases such as Griswold v. Connecticut allowed women to have parental control over childrearing, including the use of contraception for reproductive autonomy. After this, women became more informed about contraceptives and began requesting them more often.

Almost all 50 states have implemented policies on sterilization, contraceptives, and abortion services. Since the late 1990s, due to rights given by specific policies, the dispensation of emergency contraceptives on issues of religious and moral objections of providing care has extended from doctors, nurses, and hospitals to pharmacies and individual pharmacists. Furthermore, many states have insurance policies that cover contraceptives alongside all other prescription drugs, but may have exemptions for employers or private insurers on religious grounds. Different state legislatures have taken different routes in broadening access to emergency contraceptives. In some states, if a woman has been sexually assaulted, it is mandatory to provide her access to EC. In other states, women have been allowed various amounts of access, including the ability to access EC without a prescription from a physician, creation of policies limiting the ability of pharmacists to deny EC on religious and moral grounds, and creation of policies discouraging pharmacists from denying to fill contraceptive prescriptions. One state even requires all pharmacies to stock and fill every method of contraception. However, other states have restricted access of emergency contraception from state Medicaid family planning eligibility expansions or contraceptive coverage mandates, or by allowing the refusal of providing contraceptive services by healthcare professionals.

Under federal law, a provision of the Affordable Care Act of 2010 has guaranteed coverage of contraceptives, applying to most private health plans nationwide. The provision has also specifically required coverage for 18 methods of contraception used by women, related counselling and services, and requires the coverage provided not to be an out-of-pocket cost to the people. In October 2017, however, the Trump administration made it easier for employers that offer health care plans to exclude contraceptive coverage. The two regulations that allow employers to reject contraceptive coverage are religious and moral objection, but the courts have blocked the enforcement of these regulations. As of today, 29 states require that if insurance covers prescription drugs, it has to provide FDA-approved prescription contraceptive drugs and devices. 10 states prohibit the restriction and delay by insurers or medical management techniques to access contraceptives, and 8 states do not permit refusal on religious or moral grounds by any employers or insurerers. However, 21 states do allow the refusal to comply with the contraceptive coverage mandates, and 14 states prohibit cost sharing for contraceptives.

Emergency contraceptives are the most common prescription drug denied by a pharmacist due to their religious or moral beliefs. There have been cases where hormones, drugs and devices used to treat human immunodeficiency virus and diabetic medication have also been denied. This topic continues to be fought upon on different levels; for example, Stormans, Inc v Wiesman challenged Washington state regulations on providing all lawfully prescribed pharmaceuticals, including EC. They were challenging Washington state regulations on providing all lawfully prescribed pharmaceuticals. Courts have been warned that if pharmacists are allowed to deny EC prescriptions on religious or moral beliefs, it can affect public health and set a dangerous precedent with respect to "critical, life-saving preventative care". The court denied the claim, stating that all pharmacies, even if the owner has a religious objection, must provide all prescribed medication, including EC. The pharmacy in question tried to appeal the case to the Supreme Court, but the appeal was rejected, leaving the lower court's ruling in place. Wal-Mart, the third largest U.S. pharmacy chain, refused to carry EC from 1997 to 2006, which shows that accessibility may still be an issue in areas dependent on single pharmacies with no alternatives.

== See also ==
- Rape crisis center
- Reproductive Health Supplies Coalition
