= Aglepristone =

Chemical compound

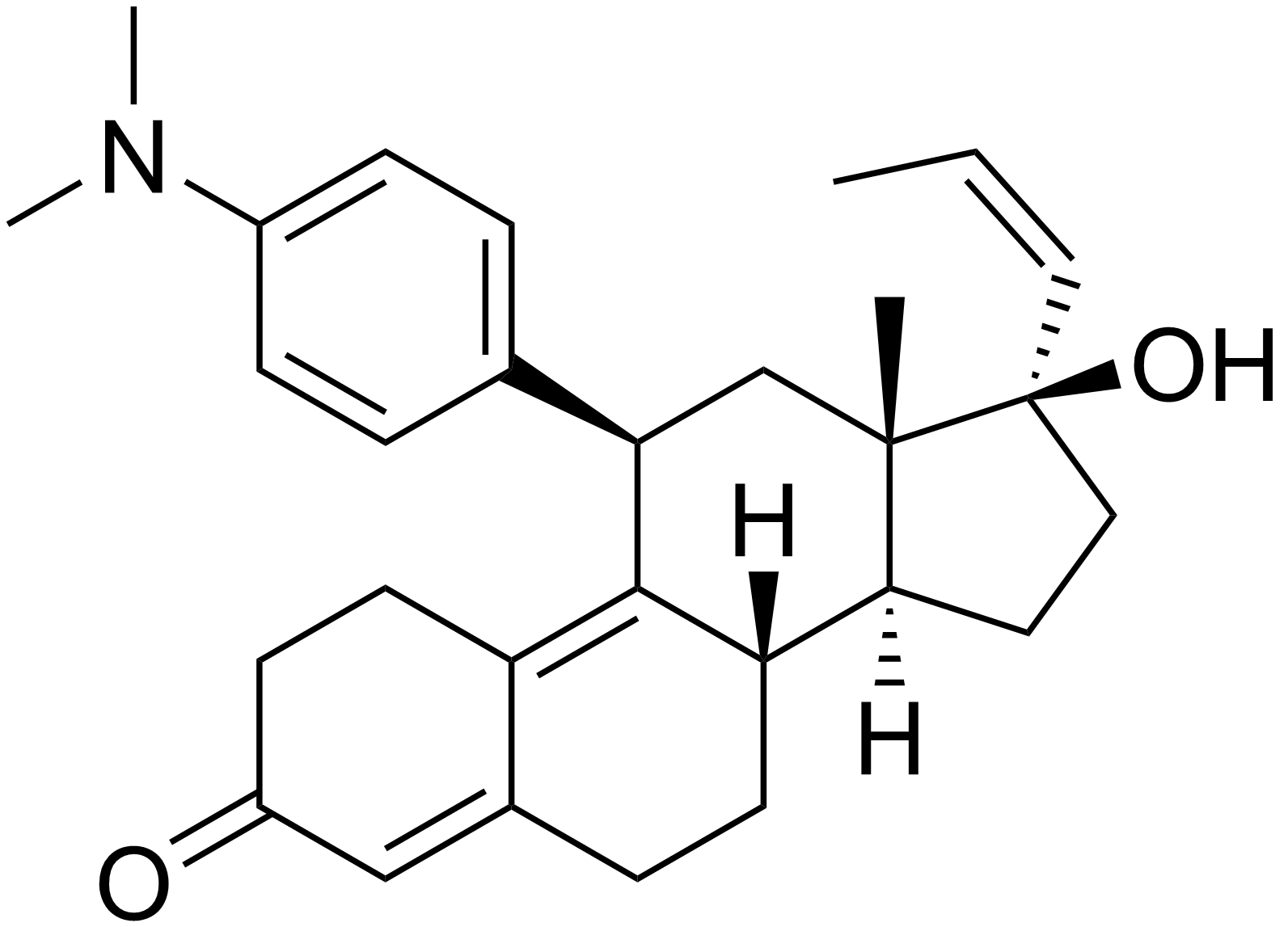

Clinical data
- Trade names: Alizin
- Other names: RU-46534; RU-534; 11β-[4-(Dimethylamino)phenyl]-17β-hydroxy-17α-[(Z)-propenyl]estra-4,9-dien-3-one
- Drug class: Antiprogestogen; Antiglucocorticoid
- ATC code: G03XB90 (WHO)

Identifiers
- IUPAC name: (8S,11R,13S,14S,17R)-11-[4-(dimethylamino)phenyl]-17-hydroxy-13-methyl-17-[(Z)-prop-1-enyl]-1,2,6,7,8,11,12,14,15,16-decahydrocyclopenta[a]phenanthren-3-one
- CAS Number: 124478-60-0
- PubChem CID: 14153279
- ChemSpider: 16736563
- UNII: 0UT4JLE1CM
- KEGG: D07096
- ChEMBL: ChEMBL2103998
- CompTox Dashboard (EPA): DTXSID001016632
- ECHA InfoCard: 100.211.372

Chemical and physical data
- Formula: C_{29}H_{37}NO_{2}
- Molar mass: 431.620 g·mol^{−1}
- 3D model (JSmol): Interactive image
- SMILES: C/C=C\[C@@]1(CC[C@@H]2[C@@]1(C[C@@H](C3=C4CCC(=O)C=C4CC[C@@H]23)C5=CC=C(C=C5)N(C)C)C)O
- InChI: InChI=1S/C29H37NO2/c1-5-15-29(32)16-14-26-24-12-8-20-17-22(31)11-13-23(20)27(24)25(18-28(26,29)2)19-6-9-21(10-7-19)30(3)4/h5-7,9-10,15,17,24-26,32H,8,11-14,16,18H2,1-4H3/b15-5-/t24-,25+,26-,28-,29-/m0/s1; Key:RTCKAOKDXNYXEH-FWSJOHTJSA-N

Aglepristone (INN) (brand name Alizin; former developmental code names RU-46534, RU-534) is a synthetic, steroidal antiprogestogen related to mifepristone. Aglepristone, similarly to mifepristone, also possesses some antiglucocorticoid activity. Aglepristone is used as an abortifacent, to induce parturition, and as a treatment for mammary hyperplasia and pyometra. It is only used in cats and dogs.

== See also ==
- Lilopristone
- Onapristone
- Telapristone
- Toripristone
