= Selective progesterone receptor modulator =

Drug affecting hormone receptors

- Drug class
- Ulipristal acetate, an SPRM that is used as an emergency contraceptive and in the treatment of uterine fibroids.

Class identifiers
- Synonyms: SPRM
- Use: Emergency contraception, uterine fibroids
- ATC code: G03XB
- Biological target: Progesterone receptor
- Chemical class: Steroidal

Legal status

A selective progesterone receptor modulator (SPRM) is an agent that acts on the progesterone receptor (PR), the biological target of progestogens like progesterone. A characteristic that distinguishes such substances from full receptor agonists (e.g., progesterone, progestins) and full antagonists (e.g., aglepristone) is that their action differs in different tissues, i.e. agonist in some tissues while antagonist in others. This mixed profile of action leads to stimulation or inhibition in tissue-specific manner, which further raises the possibility of dissociating undesirable adverse effects from the development of synthetic PR-modulator drug candidates.

== History ==
Ever since the discovery of the progesterone hormone in the mid-1930s. and especially after the discovery of its receptor in 1970 there has been a significant interest in developing an antagonistic agent for therapeutic use. Various progesterone analogs, known as progestins, were synthesized and in 1981 the first progesterone receptor antagonist was introduced by the name RU 38486 (RU 486, mifepristone). However, the clinical limitation of mifepristone due to its relatively high binding affinity for glucocorticoid receptor compared to the progesterone receptor has sparked the demand for more selective progesterone antagonist to minimize risk of adverse effects. As a contribution, so-called Selective Progesterone Receptor Modulators (SPRMs) have been developed. They have been described as agents with mixed antagonistic and agonistic effects on progesterone receptors in a tissue specific manner, while minimizing interactions with other steroidal receptors. Opposed to progesterone antagonists, the mixed agonist-antagonist SPRM, due to their intrinsic progesterone agonistic activity, have an absent or only a minimal effect on pregnancy termination and are thus ideal for treating gynecological conditions without eliminating the potential of pregnancy. Both steroidal and non steroidal SPRMs have been described and the most notable examples are asoprisnil, which failed phase 3 clinical trial in 2008, and ulipristal acetate, the first SPRM on the market (2009 in Europe).

== Progesterone receptor ==
=== Receptor ===
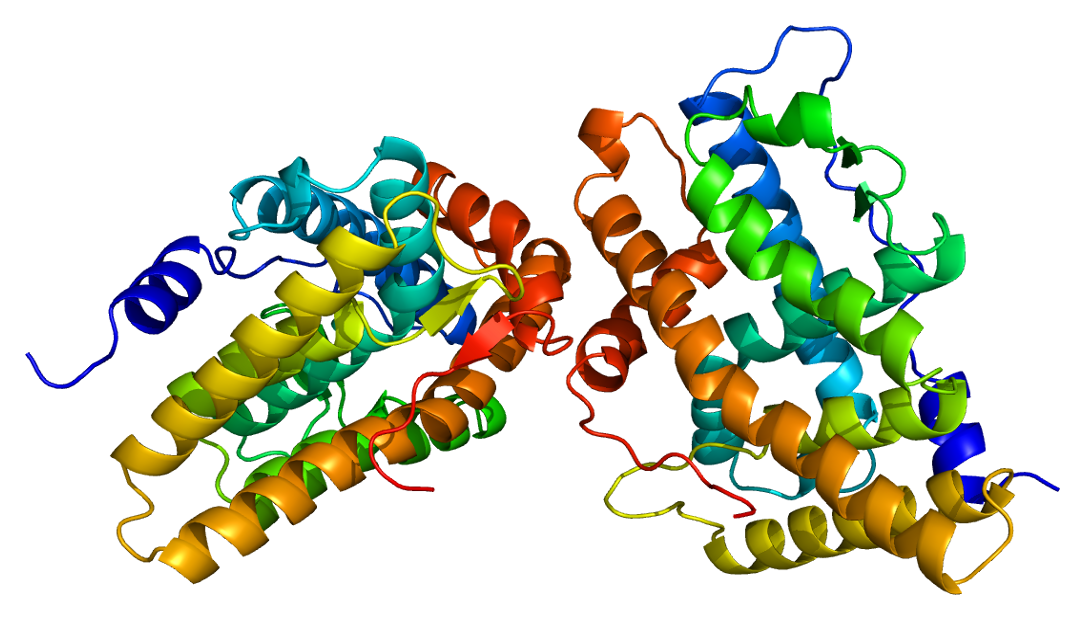
Figure 1: Progesterone Receptor

As a protein, the progesterone receptor (Fig. 1) is a member of the ligand-dependent nuclear hormone receptor family. Two major progesterone receptor isoforms, A and B, as well as some other less common splice variants have been identified and they are all encoded by the same 8 exons gene. Like other steroid nuclear receptors, the full-length protein, isoform B, can be divided into 4 functional regions, namely a variable N-terminal region followed by a highly conserved DNA-binding domain, variable hinge region and moderately conserved ligand binding domain. The ligand binding site, known as AF2 domain, is expressed by exons 4-8, corresponding to 253 amino acids, and its structure is of great interest to SPRM development. It consists of 10 α-helices (H1, H3-H12) forming 3 layered bundle entwined with 4 β-sheets . H12 is a condensed contiguous unit composed of helices 10 and 11, which has been suggested to participate in the process of co-activator binding. The ligand binding domain of the receptor is in equilibrium between two different conformations. The first is an agonist conformation which favors the binding of coactivator proteins which in turn favors upregulation of gene transcription. The second is an antagonistic conformation which in contrast favors the binding of corepressors and as a consequence down regulation of gene expression. Full agonists such as progesterone, which display agonist properties in all tissues, strongly shift the conformational equilibrium in the agonist direction. Conversely full antagonists such as aglepristone strongly shift the equilibrium in the antagonist direction. Finally, the overall ratio of concentrations of coactivator to corepressor may differ in different cell types.

=== G protein-coupled receptor ===
At the turn of the millennium it was apparent that progesterone activity was not mediated only via transcription factor, but also by a membrane-bound G protein-coupled receptor designated as 7TMPR. When the receptor is activated it blocks adenylyl cyclase, leading to decreased biosynthesis of the intracellular second-messenger cAMP.

=== Downstream mechanisms ===
Since the 1990s it has been evident that the two major receptor isomers, A and B, are functionally distinct within the female reproductive system. Researches aimed at expression profile of the isomers suggests that the isomers are expressed in different tissues at different times throughout the menstrual cycle. The PR-B has been found to be upregulated in the stroma and glandular epithelium during follicular phase, but is down-regluated in both tissues during luteal phase. On the contrary, PR-A is upregulated in both tissue types in the follicular phase and persists in the stromal tissue during the late luteal phase. Studies have shown that PR-B activation is important for growth and development of the mammary gland, whereas PR-A has a significant role in normal reproductive function and ovulation. As well, in vitro researches have demonstrated that under identical conditions, the PR-B works as stronger transactivator of reporter genes, while PR-A is able to transrepress PR-B and other steroid receptors. Various reasons have been found for this variety of function between the isoforms. First to mention is that progesterone receptor isoform A lacks 164 N-terminal amino acids compared to isomer B, depriving it of the AF-3 activation function due to loss of B-upstream segment, which leaves it with only 2 activation functions. Also, studies of mechanism have shown difference in cofactor recruitment between the isoforms. Due to these functional differences, one can see why there is an interest of developing a drug that can selectively target the receptor isoforms. Development of SPRMs has, in some cases, been focused on targeting these two different isoforms.

=== SPRM interaction with receptor binding pockets ===
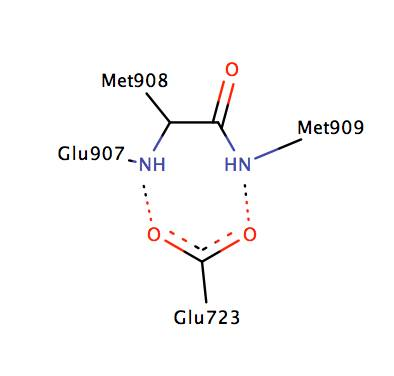
Helix-3 stabilizes helix-12 in the progesterone receptor

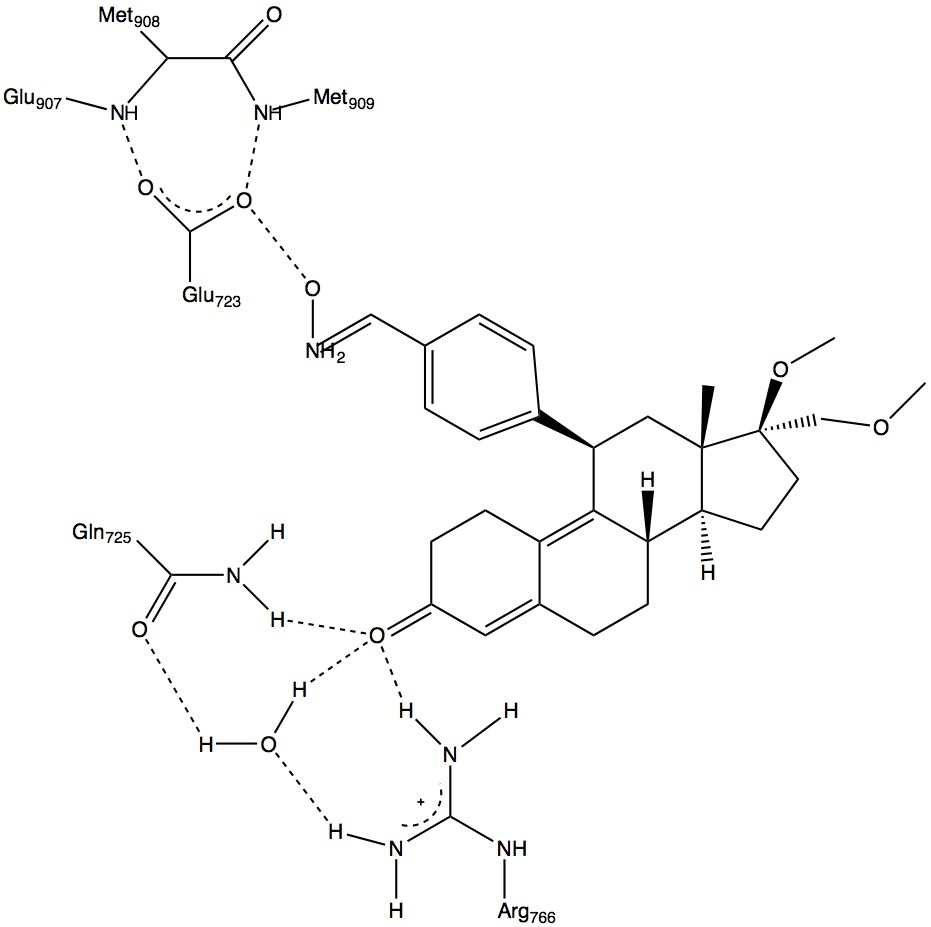
Increased stabilization of helix-12 caused by agonistic interaction of asoprisnil

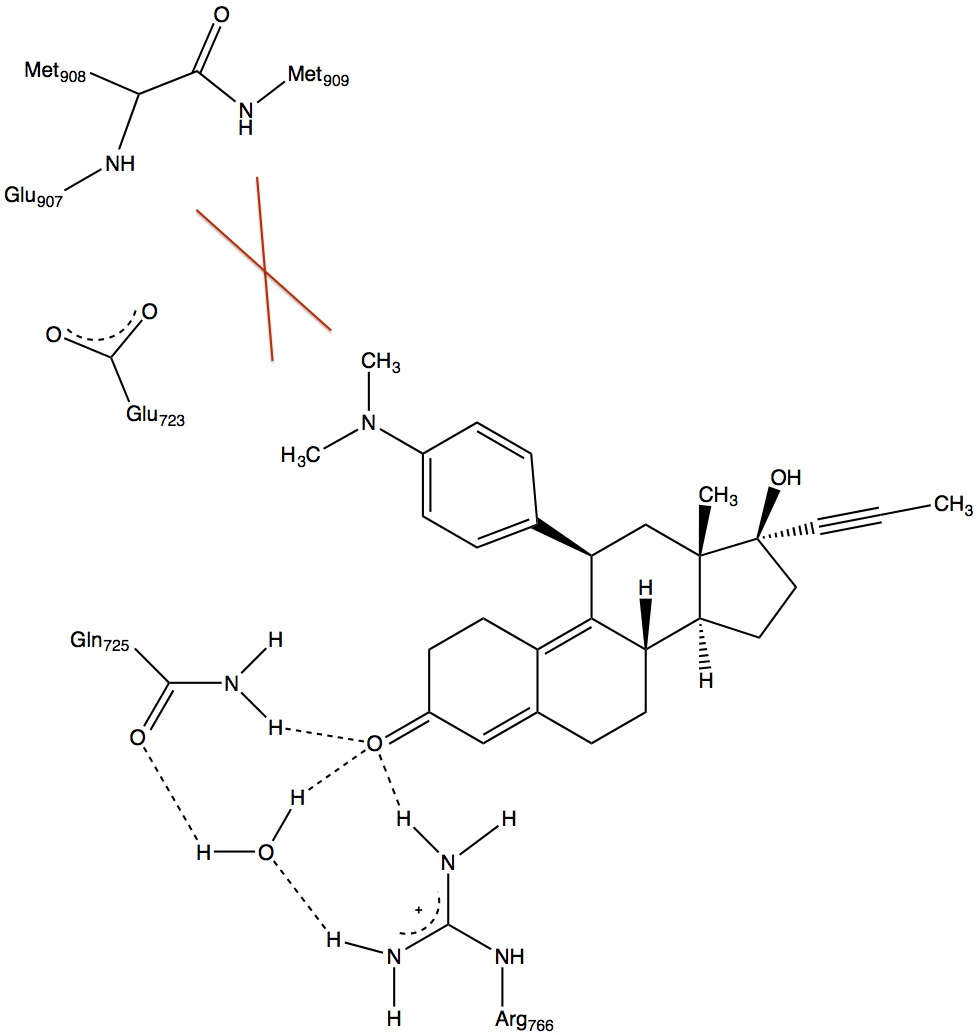
Destabilization of helix-12 and helix-3 interaction caused by antagonist binding of mifepristone to progesterone receptor

Figure 2: Ligand-progesterone receptor binding interaction

Certain interactions between ligand and progesterone receptor have been described to be important for ligand binding (Fig. 2). Crystallography studies of progesterone bound to its receptor have revealed an important hydrogen bond interaction between the progesterone electron-withdrawing 3-keto group and the residues Gln_{725} of helix-3 and Arg_{766} of helix-5, which are held in position by a structural water molecule. This interaction has been shown to be present in interaction with various other ligands, e.g. mifepristone, tanaproget and asoprisnil and thus can be considered to be vital interaction for function of both agonists and antagonists. Furthermore, progesterone and tanaproget, have been found to make a hydrogen bond with Asn_{719} in helix-3, giving an opportunity of higher selectivity and affinity, however, the SPRM asoprisnil has been found not to interact with this residue. Even though the polar residue Thr_{894} is in close proximity to the C_{20} carbonyl group of progesterone there is not formed any hydrogen bond between these chemical groups. The Thr_{894} has been found to interact with other ligands.

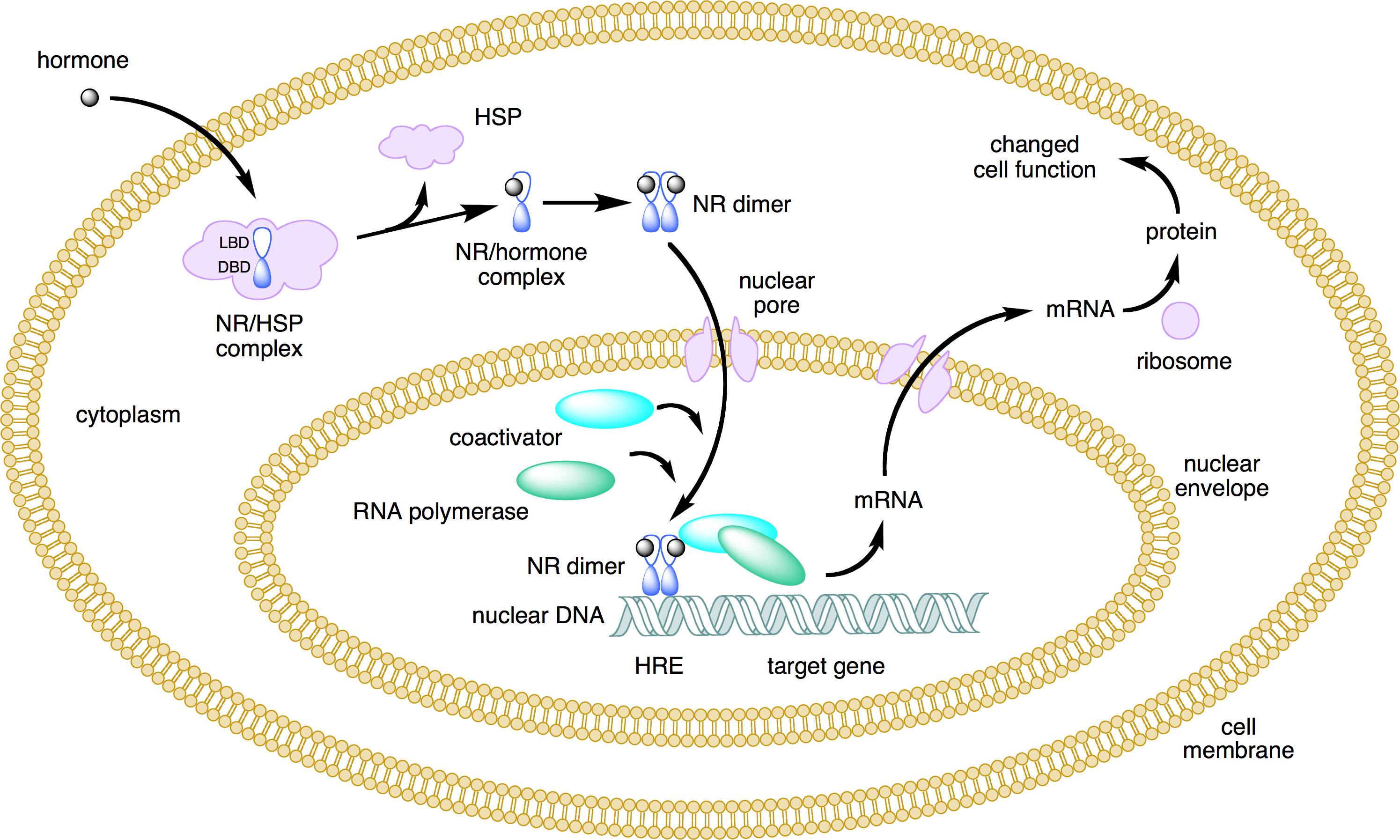
Figure 3: Mechanism of action of SPRMs. In this figure, the SPRM is designated a hormone and the progesterone receptor is designated NR (nuclear receptor).

Various studies have described the presence of a hydrophobic pocket, referred as 17α pocket, which consists of Leu_{715}, Leu_{718}, Phe_{794}, Leu_{797}, Met_{801} and Tyr_{890} and appears to provide additional room for ligand expansion irrespective of agonism or antagonism. The 17α pocket, along with Met_{756} and Met_{759} within helix-5, as well as Met_{909}, show a surprising flexibility in accommodation of various ligands, making the progesterone receptor very adaptive when it comes to binding. Studies comparing the conformational changes in helix-12 contributing to agonistic and antagonistic effects have shown an important hydrogen interaction with Glu_{723} residue of helix-3. At inactive state the Glu_{723} stabilizes conformation of helix-12 by forming a hydrogen bond to main chain amines in Met_{908} and Met_{909}. When a ligand conducts an agonist effect, such as the oxime group of asoprisnil interacting with agonist binding pocket, then the hydrogen bond interaction between the previously mentioned residues in helix-12 and helix-3 strengthens, leading to docking and recruitment of coactivators. However, when an antagonist, e.g. mifepristone, interacts with this hydrogen bond system then its dimethylamine group clashes in to Met_{909} and destabilizes helix-12, causing a conformational change, which promotes the recruitment of corepressors.

== Mechanism of action ==
When SPRMs bind to the progesterone receptor, the equilibrium between the two conformational states is more closely balanced and hence more easily perturbed by differences in the cellular environment. In tissues where the concentration of coactivators is higher than corepressors, the excess coactivators drive the equilibrium in the agonist direction. Conversely in tissues where corepressor concentration is higher the equilibrium is driven in the antagonist direction. Hence SPRMs display agonist activity in tissues where coactivators predominate and antagonist activity where corepressors are in excess.

When inactive the progesterone receptor, as for other steroid receptor, forms a complex consisting of itself, heat shock proteins (hsp70, hsp90) and immunophilins. Upon activation, due to hormone binding to ligand binding pocket, the receptor complex has been shown to dissociate, triggering nuclear import and giving the receptor the property of dimerisation (Fig. 3). In the nucleus the dimer interacts with progesterone hormone response element in the DNA causing upregulation or downregulation of the gene. Various studies have demonstrated that it affects expression of up to 100 different genes, depending on receptor isomer. In the action of agonism there occur conformational changes, where alpha helices 3, 4 and 12 create a docking surface for coactivator proteins, which act as bridging factors between the receptor and the general transcription machinery. However, the antagonist prevents proper packing of alpha helix 12 against helices 3 and 4, impairing the receptor’s ability to interact with coactivators, which allows recruitment of corepressor, such as SMRT and NCoR. Due to the minimal recruitment of corepressors during agonist binding then there has been postulated by Liu et al., 2002, that the ratio between coactivators vs. corepressors recruitment might be the determinant whether compound is considered to be an agonist, antagonist or mixed agonist-antagonist. The selective progesterone receptor modulators have been described as agents with mixed agonist-antagonist activity and thus the mechanism of action must be due to a balance of these functions.

== Structure-activity relationships ==
=== Steroidal SPRMs ===
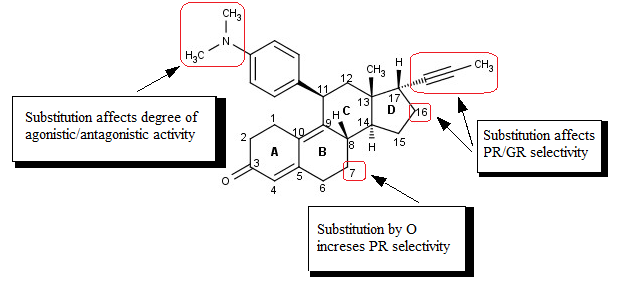
Figure 4: Structure–activity relationships in mifepristone analogs

The research on mifepristone analogs, mainly focused on the improvement of the ratio of antiprogestational/antiglucocorticoid activity, led to the discovery of SPRMs. Modifications of or near the 17-alpha propinyl group (Fig. 4) on the D ring play a key role in binding to the progesterone receptor and/or glucocorticoid receptor. Minor changes in the 17-alpha region generate antiprogestins with reduced antiglucocorticoidal activity, where alpha refers to an absolute steroidal stereodescriptor. It seems that hydrophobic 17-alpha substituents such as 17-alpha ethyl and 17-alpha (1´-pentynyl) give rise to antiprogestational activity superior to that of mifepristone. Substitution on the 17-alpha position involving phenyl group with small, electron-withdrawing substituents, such as F and CF_{3}, on the para-position was also found to greatly increase the selectivity over glucocorticoid receptor as well as the potency of resulting compounds. Same substitution at the ortho- or meta- position led to decrease in selectivity. Bulky substituents, such as tert-butyl, in this region decrease the progesterone potency.

The available biological and X-ray data suggest that the substitution of 4-(dimethylamino) phenyl group at the C11 (Fig. 4) position determines the degree of agonistic and antagonistic activity. Small substituents like methyl or vinyl give rise to potent progesterone receptor-agonistic properties whereas substituted phenyl derivatives show different degrees of antagonistic activity. There is an indication, when substituted by various nitrogen heterocycles, that the most agonistic are compounds with a clear maximum in the negative electric potential in the region of the meta- and para- atoms of the aryl ring whereas compounds that lack a center of electronegativity in this region have the highest antagonistic activity.

Modification of the core steroidal structure affects the mode of binding to the progesterone receptor. The substitution of C7 (Fig. 4) by oxygen atom has been investigated and these mifepristone-like oxasteroids showed increased selectivity over glucocorticoid receptor but were less potent than mifepristone.

=== Nonsteroidal SPRMs ===
Progesterone receptor modulators with unique nonsteroidal structures are currently in the early stages of development (Fig. 5-12). Variety of new types of progesterone receptor antagonists with different degree of potency has been reported and show a remarkable structural diversity which can be seen in table below. Various lead compounds have also been identified as new progesterone receptor agonists. They can also be viewed in the table.

Antagonists	Figure 5: Progesterone receptor antagonists based on a pyrazole core	Figure 6: Trisubstituted thiophenes as PR antagonists with low potency	Figure 7: Indole derivatives as PR antagonists with preference of electron withdrawing groups on the aromatic ring	Figure 8: 6-aryl-1,3dihydrobenzimidazol -2ones substituent at the 1-position of the benzimidazolone	Figure 9: PR antagonists with an aryl group inked to benzoxazin-2-one core through an amino group at the 6-position
Agonists	Figure 10: 6-(5-cyanopyrrol-2-yl) benzoxazine- 2-thiones	Figure 11: Tetrahydrobenzindolone lead compound with high selectivity	Figure 12: Arylpyrazolines and aryldiazepines as PR modulators		

== Drugs ==
Members include:

- Ulipristal acetate ("Ella")
- Asoprisnil (J867; status uncertain)
- Telapristone (CDB-4124; Proellex, Progenta; under development)

SPRM have been suggested for multiple gynaecological applications, such as contraception and emergency contraception, treatment for endometriosis, uterine leiomyoma and as a hormone replacing therapy in post-menopausal women. SPRM activity is mainly mediated via the progesterone receptor, where the endometrium is the major target tissue. In contrast to conventional progesterone antagonists, the SPRMs eliminate the ability to terminate pregnancy due to their mixed antagonist/agonist profile. Since SPRMs have a low affinity for the estrogen receptor, they are not thought to induce post-menopausal associated bone loss. SPRMs use has been associated with endometrial metaplasia, which calls for the need for a long-term safety assessment.

Compound	Chemical structure
Ulipristal acetate	Figure 13: Ulipristal acetate skeletal Figure 13
Asoprisnil	Asoprisnil Figure 14
Telapristone	Telapristone Figure 15

=== Ulipristal acetate ===
Ulipristal acetate (also known as CDB-2914) (Fig. 13) is an 11-β aryl substituted SPRM that has been available as an emergency contraception in Europe since 2009 and was FDA approved in 2010. It’s also marketed as a treatment for uterine leiomyoma in North America and Europe. As an emergency contraception ulipristal acetate has shown to be potent up to 120h after unprotected intercourse, compared to 72h potency of current emergency contraceptions. In post-menopausal endometrium the compound seems to have antagonistic effect or progesterone receptor, indicating potential use in menopausal treatment but this has yet to be confirmed.

=== Asoprisnil ===
Asoprisnil (J867) is a steroidal 11β-benzaldoxime substituted SPRM (Fig. 14). The geometry of its oxime group is suggested to play a major role in the in vitro potency. It has been suggested as a treatment for leiomyoma and endometriosis and it is the first SPRM in the clinical development of endometriosis treatment to reach an advanced phase.

=== Telapristone ===
Telapristone (CDB-4124), also known as Proellex (Fig. 15), entered phase II clinical trial for in treatment uterine fibroids in 2014 and has a planned phase II clinical trial for alleviation of symptoms of endometriosis in early 2016. It has also been suggested to have chemopreventive effects.

== Uses ==
SPRMs are under development for the following uses:

- Asoprisnil and telapristone are both under investigation (2005) for the medical treatment of uterine leiomyoma.
- Proellex has completed a number of clinical trials to treat endometriosis and uterine fibroids.

While these SPRMs have been effective for the treatment of uterine fibroids, development of side effects such as endometrial thickening has limited their administration to no longer than three to four months.

== Future ==
Due to its antiglucocorticoidal activity, mifepristone is investigated for its therapeutical potential in indications like Cushing's syndrome, Alzheimer's disease or psychosis. Beside that SPRMs are under development for various gynecological applications, including estrogen-free contraception, uterine leiomyoma and endometriosis.

== See also ==
- Phytoprogestogen
- Selective androgen receptor modulator
- Selective estrogen receptor modulator
- Selective glucocorticoid receptor agonist
- Selective receptor modulator
