= Ulipristal acetate =

Chemical compound

Clinical data
- Trade names: Ella, EllaOne, Esmya, others
- Other names: CDB-2914; 11β-[4-(Dimethylamino)phenyl]-17α-acetoxy-19-norpregna-4,9-diene-3,20-dione
- AHFS/Drugs.com: Monograph
- License data: US DailyMed: Ulipristal acetate
- Routes of administration: By mouth
- Drug class: Selective progesterone receptor modulator
- ATC code: G03AD02 (WHO) G03XB02 (WHO)

Legal status
- Legal status: AU: S4 (Prescription only); UK: POM (Prescription only) / P; US: ℞-only; EU: Rx-only

Pharmacokinetic data
- Bioavailability: Nearly 100%
- Protein binding: 96.7–99.5%
- Metabolism: CYP3A4 and CYP1A2
- Elimination half-life: 32 hours
- Excretion: ca. 90% with feces

Identifiers
- IUPAC name: [(8S,11R,13S,14S,17R)-17-acetyl-11-[4-(dimethylamino)phenyl]-13-methyl-3-oxo-1,2,6,7,8,11,12,14,15,16-decahydrocyclopenta[a]phenanthren-17-yl] acetate
- CAS Number: 126784-99-4
- PubChem CID: 130904
- IUPHAR/BPS: 7460
- DrugBank: DB08867
- ChemSpider: 115762
- UNII: YF7V70N02B
- KEGG: D09687
- ChEBI: CHEBI:71025
- ChEMBL: ChEMBL260538
- CompTox Dashboard (EPA): DTXSID30155294
- ECHA InfoCard: 100.207.349

Chemical and physical data
- Formula: C_{30}H_{37}NO_{4}
- Molar mass: 475.629 g·mol^{−1}
- 3D model (JSmol): Interactive image
- SMILES: CC(=O)OC4(C(C)=O)CCC3C1CCC2=CC(=O)CCC2=C1C(CC34C)c5ccc(N(C)C)cc5
- InChI: InChI=1S/C30H37NO4/c1-18(32)30(35-19(2)33)15-14-27-25-12-8-21-16-23(34)11-13-24(21)28(25)26(17-29(27,30)3)20-6-9-22(10-7-20)31(4)5/h6-7,9-10,16,25-27H,8,11-15,17H2,1-5H3/t25-,26+,27-,29-,30-/m0/s1; Key:OOLLAFOLCSJHRE-ZHAKMVSLSA-N

Ulipristal acetate, sold under the brand name Ella among others, is a medication used for emergency contraception (birth control) and uterine fibroids. As emergency contraception it should be used within 120 hours of vaginally penetrating intercourse. For fibroids it may be taken for up to six months. It is taken by mouth.

Common side effects include headache, nausea, feeling tired, and abdominal pain. It should not be used in women who are already pregnant. It is in the selective progesterone receptor modulator (SPRM) class of medications. It works by preventing the effects of progesterone, therefore preventing ovulation but not affecting fertilization or implantation.

Ulipristal acetate was approved for medical use in the United States in 2010. It is on the World Health Organization's List of Essential Medicines.

== Medical uses ==
=== Emergency contraception ===
For emergency contraception a 30 mg tablet is used within 120 hours (5 days) after unprotected intercourse or contraceptive failure. It has been shown to prevent about 62–85% of expected pregnancies, and prevents more pregnancies than emergency contraception with levonorgestrel. Ulipristal acetate is available by prescription for emergency contraception in over 50 countries, with access through pharmacists without a prescription being tested in the United Kingdom. In November 2014, the European Medicines Agency (EMA) recommended availability of ellaOne emergency contraceptive without prescription in the European Union. In January 2015 the European Commission issued an implementing decision amending accordingly the marketing authorization of EllaOne in the EU. Since July 2016, it is available without prescription in Israel.

=== Uterine fibroids ===
Ulipristal acetate is used for pre-operative treatment of moderate to severe symptoms of uterine fibroids in adult women of reproductive age. The use of ulipristal acetate to treat fibroids was suspended in the European Union in March 2020.

In November 2020, the Committee for Medicinal Products for Human Use (CHMP) of the European Medicines Agency (EMA) recommended that ulipristal acetate be used only to treat uterine fibroids in premenopausal women for whom surgical procedures (including uterine fibroid embolization) are not appropriate or have not worked. In addition, the committee stated that ulipristal acetate must not be used for controlling symptoms of uterine fibroids while awaiting surgical treatment.

Treatment of uterine fibroids with ulipristal acetate for 13 weeks effectively controlled excessive bleeding due to uterine fibroids and reduced the size of the fibroids.

Two intermittent 3-months treatment courses of ulipristal acetate 10 mg resulted in amenorrhea at the end of the first treatment course in 79.5%, at the end of the second course in 88.5% of subjects. Mean myoma volume reduction observed during the first treatment course (−41.9%) was maintained during the second one (−43.7%). After two to four 3-months courses of treatment, UPA-treated fibroids shown about -70% in volume reduction.

Volume reduction of uterine fibroid induced by ulipristal acetate was tentatively explained by the combination of multifactorial events involving control of proliferation of the tumor cells, induction of apoptosis and remodeling of the extracellular matrix under the action of matrix metalloproteinases.

In May 2018, the European Medicines Agency (EMA) recommended measures to minimize the risk of rare but serious liver injury with ulipristal, including contraindication in women with known liver problems; liver tests before, during and after stopping treatment; a card for women to inform them about the need for liver monitoring and to contact their doctor should they develop symptoms of liver injury. In addition, use of the medicine for more than one treatment course has been restricted to women who are not eligible for surgery.

There is currently no consistent or convincing evidence that ulipristal acetate at the emergency contraceptive dose causes clinically meaningful changes in endometrial gene expression that would affect endometrial receptivity or prevent implantation. There is limited but emerging evidence suggesting ulipristal acetate (UPA) is associated with favorable pregnancy outcomes—including successful full-term pregnancies—when used to treat uterine fibroids in women with prior miscarriage history.

=== Abortion ===
A 2025 preliminary clinical study on 133 pregnant women indicated the possibility that ulipristal acetate, at a substantially higher dose than used for contraception and combined with misoprostol, could be used as a more widely available and similarly effective substitute for the abortifacient mifepristone.

== Contraindications ==
Ulipristal acetate should not be taken by women with severe liver diseases because of its CYP mediated metabolism. It has not been studied in women under the age of 18.

It is also not recommended for women with severe asthma receiving glucocorticoid treatment because it has shown antiglucocorticoid effects in animal studies.

=== Pregnancy ===
Unlike levonorgestrel, and like mifepristone, ulipristal acetate is embryotoxic in animal studies. Before taking the drug, a pregnancy must be excluded. The EMA proposed to avoid any allusion to a possible use as an abortifacient in the package insert to avert off-label use. Prior to the 2025 study mentioned above, it was considered unlikely that ulipristal acetate could effectively be used as an abortifacient, since it is used in much lower doses (30 mg) than the roughly equipotent mifepristone (600 mg), and since mifepristone has to be combined with a prostaglandin for the induction of abortion. However, data on embryotoxicity in humans are very limited, and it is not clear what the risk for an abortion or for teratogenicity (birth defects) is. Of the 29 women studied who became pregnant despite taking ulipristal acetate, 16 had induced abortions, six had spontaneous abortions, six continued the pregnancies, and one was lost to follow-up.

=== Lactation ===
It is not recommended to breast feed within seven days of taking the drug since ulipristal acetate is excreted into the breast milk, and possible effects on the infant have not been studied.

== Side effects ==
The most common side effects include headache, nausea (feeling sick), abdominal pain (stomach ache), and dysmenorrhea (period pains).

== Interactions ==
Ulipristal acetate is metabolized by CYP3A4 in vitro. Ulipristal acetate is likely to interact with substrates of CYP3A4, like rifampicin, phenytoin, St John's wort, carbamazepine or ritonavir, therefore concomitant use with these agents is not recommended. It might also interact with hormonal contraceptives and progestogens such as levonorgestrel and other substrates of the progesterone receptor, as well as with glucocorticoids.

== Pharmacology ==
=== Pharmacodynamics ===
As an SPRM, ulipristal acetate has partial agonistic as well as antagonistic effects on the progesterone receptor. Ulipristal acetate exhibits similar potency to antagonize progesterone receptor as mifepristone in vitro. It also binds to the androgen receptor and the glucocorticoid receptor, but is only a weak antiandrogen and antiglucocorticoid relative to flutamide and mifepristone, respectively. Ulipristal acetate has no relevant affinity to the estrogen and mineralocorticoid receptors. Phase II clinical trials suggest that the mechanism might consist of blocking or delaying ovulation and of delaying the maturation of the endometrium.

=== Pharmacokinetics ===
In animal studies, the drug was quickly and nearly completely absorbed from the gut. Intake of food delays absorption, but it is not known whether this is clinically relevant.

Ulipristal acetate is metabolized in the liver, most likely by CYP3A4, and to a small extent by CYP1A2 and CYP2D6. The two main metabolites have been shown to be pharmacologically active, but less than the original drug. The main excretion route is via the feces.

== History ==
Ulipristal acetate was granted marketing authorization by the European Medicines Agency (EMA) in May 2009. In 2014, the EMA recommended ulipristal be made available without a prescription in the European Union.

The U.S. Food and Drug Administration (FDA) approved the drug for use in the United States on 13 August 2010, following the FDA advisory committee's recommendation. Watson Pharmaceuticals announced the availability of ulipristal acetate in the United States on 1 December 2010, in retail pharmacies, clinics, and one on-line pharmacy, KwikMed.

== Society and culture ==
=== Brand names ===
Ulipristal acetate is marketed as an emergency contraceptive (30 mg) in over 75 countries, under different brands such as ella, ellaOne, Dvella, FemelleOne, Femke, Lencya, Prevent One, ulip, Ulipristal Stada, Ulipristal Mylan, Ulipristal acetate Sandoz and others.

Ulipristal acetate is also marketed for treatment of uterine fibroids, under different brands such as Esmya or Primette.
