= Antiglucocorticoid =

Class of pharmaceutical drugs

- Drug class
- Mifepristone, an antiglucocorticoid that is used in the treatment of Cushing's syndrome.

Class identifiers
- Synonyms: Glucocorticoid antagonist; Cortisol antagonist; Anticorticosteroid
- Use: Cushing's syndrome, others
- Biological target: Glucocorticoid receptor
- Chemical class: Steroids

Legal status

Antiglucocorticoid drugs are a class of medications that act to reduce the effects of glucocorticoids, primarily cortisol, in the body. They include direct glucocorticoid receptor antagonists such as mifepristone and synthesis inhibitors such as metyrapone, ketoconazole, and aminoglutethimide. They are used to treat Cushing's syndrome.

These drugs have also been investigated for their potential therapeutic benefits in various psychiatric disorders, particularly depression and psychosis. The rationale behind using antiglucocorticoids in psychiatry stems from the observed dysregulation of the hypothalamic-pituitary-adrenal (HPA) axis in many psychiatric conditions, which often manifests as elevated cortisol levels.

== Types ==
There are several types of antiglucocorticoid drugs, including:

1. Cortisol synthesis inhibitors: These drugs, such as metyrapone, aminoglutethimide, and ketoconazole, work by blocking the production of cortisol in the adrenal glands.
2. Glucocorticoid receptor antagonists: Mifepristone (RU-486) is the primary example of this class, which directly blocks the action of cortisol at its receptor sites.
3. Steroid hormones: Dehydroepiandrosterone (DHEA) has been studied for its potential antiglucocorticoid effects.

== Therapeutic applications ==
=== Cushing's syndrome ===
Antiglucocorticoid drugs are a treatment option for Cushing's syndrome, a condition characterized by excessive cortisol production. These medications are primarily used in two scenarios: as preoperative treatment to manage symptoms and reduce surgical risks, and as a long-term solution when surgery has failed or is not feasible. The main antiglucocorticoid agents employed in treating Cushing's syndrome include steroidogenesis inhibitors such as metyrapone and ketoconazole, which block cortisol production, and mifepristone (RU-486), which directly antagonizes the glucocorticoid receptor. Metyrapone and ketoconazole are often preferred as first-line pharmacological treatments, either as monotherapy or in combination, due to their efficacy in controlling hypercortisolemia. However, careful monitoring is essential during treatment, as these drugs can potentially cause side effects and, in some cases, lead to adrenal insufficiency. While antiglucocorticoid therapy has shown promise in managing Cushing's syndrome, it is generally considered an adjunctive treatment to surgery, which remains the definitive cure for most cases of the disorder.

=== Psychiatric disorders ===
The use of antiglucocorticoid drugs for psychiatric disorders has yielded mixed results. Some studies have shown promise in treating major depression, particularly in cases with psychotic features. However, a Cochrane review of antiglucocorticoid treatments for psychosis found no significant differences in overall psychotic symptoms, positive symptoms, or negative symptoms when compared to placebo.

The mechanism of action for antiglucocorticoid drugs in psychiatric disorders is not fully understood. One hypothesis suggests that these drugs may work by reducing glucocorticoid enhancement of corticotropin-releasing hormone (CRH) action in certain brain regions, such as the central nucleus of the amygdala. Additionally, these drugs may affect glucocorticoid receptor regulation, neuroactive steroids, and classical monoamine systems.

== See also ==
- Corticosteroid
- Antimineralocorticoid
