= Spirolactone =

Concept in organic chemistry

The first three skeletal formulae belong to spirolactone antimineralocorticoids.

Spirolactones are a class of functional group in organic chemistry featuring a cyclic ester attached spiro to another ring system. The name is also used to refer to a class of synthetic steroids, called steroid-17α-spirolactones, 17α-spirolactosteroids, or simply 17α-spirolactones, which feature their spirolactone group at the C17α position. They are antimineralocorticoids, or antagonists of the mineralocorticoid receptor (which is activated predominantly by the mineralocorticoid steroid hormone aldosterone), and have been employed clinically as potassium-sparing diuretics. Some also possess progestogenic and/or antiandrogen properties, which have both contributed to side effects and been utilized for medical indications (e.g., spironolactone as an antiandrogen, and drospirenone as a progestin). The spirolactones were developed by G. D. Searle & Company in the 1950s and thereafter and were denoted as "SC" compounds (e.g., SC-9420 for spironolactone).

The spirolactones include the marketed drugs spironolactone (SC-9420; Aldactone), canrenone (SC-9376; Cantaren, Luvion), potassium canrenoate (SC-14266; Venactone, Soldactone), eplerenone (SC-66110, CGP-30083; Inspra), and drospirenone (ZK-30595; Yasmin). Spirolactones that were not ever marketed include SC-5233, SC-8109, SC-11927 (Catatoxic Steroid 1; CS-1), spiroxasone, prorenone (SC-23133), prorenoate potassium (SC-23992), 7α-thiospironolactone (SC-24813), mexrenone (SC-25152, ZK-32055), dicirenone (SC-26304), 7α-thiomethylspironolactone (SC-26519), mexrenoate potassium (SC-26714), spirorenone (ZK-35973), ZK-91587 (15β,16β-methylenemexrenone), mespirenone (ZK-94679), and ZK-97894 (7α-thiomethylmespirenone). Oxprenoate potassium (RU-28318) is not a spirolactone by definition but is a closely related antimineralocorticoid that was never marketed.

SC-5233 (6,7-dihydrocanrenone), the C17α propanoic acid lactone of testosterone (androst-4-en-17β-ol-3-one), is the unsubstituted parent or prototype compound of the spirolactones, and is one of a few of the simplest members of the series along with SC-8109 (the 19-demethyl analogue of SC-5233) and canrenone (the 1,2-didehydro analogue of SC-5233). Spironolactone is a derivative of SC-5233 with a 7α-acetylthio group (that is, SC-5233 is 7α-desthioacetylspironolactone).

Chemical structures of spirolactones
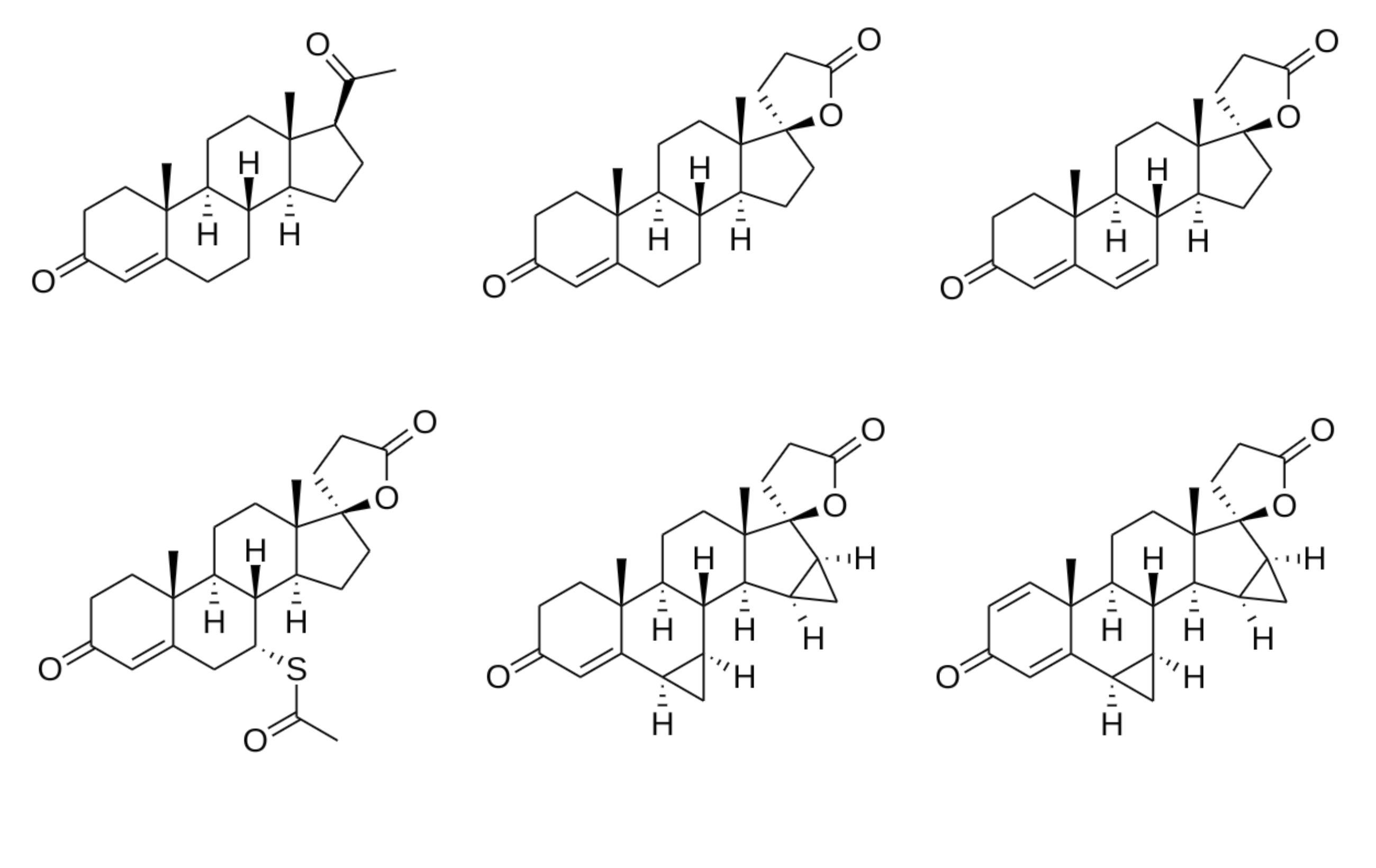
Chemical structures of progesterone and spirolactones (steroid-17α-spirolactones).

== See also ==
- 7α-Thioprogesterone (SC-8365)
