= Spirorenone =

Chemical compound

Clinical data
- Routes of administration: Oral
- ATC code: None

Identifiers
- IUPAC name: (1aR,5aR,5bS,7aS,8S,8aS,9aS,9bS,9cR,9dR)-5a,7a-Dimethyl-1,1a,5b,6,7,7a,8a,9,9a,9b,9c,9d-dodecahydro-3'H-spiro[cyclopropa[4,5]cyclopenta[1,2-a]cyclopropa[l]phenanthrene-8,2'-furan]-3,5'(4'H,5aH)-dione
- CAS Number: 74220-07-8
- PubChem CID: 68923
- ChemSpider: 62150
- UNII: B8TEV07170
- ChEMBL: ChEMBL2107584
- CompTox Dashboard (EPA): DTXSID501024537
- ECHA InfoCard: 100.070.679

Chemical and physical data
- Formula: C_{24}H_{28}O_{3}
- Molar mass: 364.485 g·mol^{−1}
- 3D model (JSmol): Interactive image
- SMILES: CC12CCC3C(C1C4CC4C25CCC(=O)O5)C6CC6C7=CC(=O)C=CC37C
- InChI: InChI=1S/C24H28O3/c1-22-6-3-12(25)9-17(22)13-10-14(13)20-16(22)4-7-23(2)21(20)15-11-18(15)24(23)8-5-19(26)27-24/h3,6,9,13-16,18,20-21H,4-5,7-8,10-11H2,1-2H3/t13-,14+,15-,16+,18+,20-,21+,22-,23+,24+/m1/s1; Key:NZUIUYWHFPQZBH-HXCATZOESA-N

Spirorenone (INN; developmental code ZK-35973) is a steroidal antimineralocorticoid of the spirolactone group that was never marketed. Spirorenone possesses 5–8 times the antimineralocorticoid activity of spironolactone in animal studies. The initial discovery of spirorenone was deemed a great success, as no compound with greater antimineralocorticoid activity had been developed since spironolactone in 1957. Moreover, spirorenone itself has virtually no affinity for the androgen receptor while its progestogenic activity shows species differences, being somewhat greater than that of spironolactone in rabbits but absent in mice and rats. As such, it was characterized as a highly potent antimineralocorticoid with far fewer hormonal side effects relative to spironolactone.

In clinical trials, spirorenone was found to be 4- to 10-fold as potent as spironolactone as an antimineralocorticoid, and is said to be the most active antimineralocorticoid identified to date. However, it was serendipitously and unexpectedly found that low doses of spirorenone lowered testosterone levels in men during clinical studies. This was determined to be due to metabolic conversion of spirorenone into drospirenone (1,2-dihydrospirorenone) by the enzyme Δ^{1}-hydrase, a transformation that occurs only in monkeys and humans. Unlike spirorenone, drospirenone was found to be a highly potent progestin and antiandrogen in addition to antimineralocorticoid, with 8-fold the potency of spironolactone as an antimineralocorticoid and 0.3 times the potency of cyproterone acetate as an antiandrogen. Subsequently, investigation of spirorenone was discontinued and drospirenone was developed and eventually introduced instead as a contraceptive.

== Synthesis ==
Synthesis: Patents: Prec: HPLC:

The 7-hydroxylation of 15,16β-cyclopropan-Androstenolone PC13075949 (1). Though this transformation has also been accomplished by chemical means, microbiological oxidation by Botryodiplodia malorum apparently proves superior to give PC44520204 (2). Acylation with pivalic anhydride proceeds selectively at the 3 hydroxyl group [82543-09-7] (). Epoxidation by means of tertiary butylhydroperoxide (tbhp) and Vanadyl acetylacetonate gives affords exclusively the β-epoxide [82544-13-6] (3). The remaining hydroxyl is then displaced by chlorine by means of triphenylphosphine and carbon tetrachloride, PC13075960 (4). Sequential reductive elimination followed by saponification gives the allylic alcohol [82543-15-5] (5). Reaction with the Simmons-Smith reagent affords the corresponding cyclopropane [82543-16-6] (6) the stereochemistry being determined by the adjacent hydroxyl group. Addition of the dianion from propargyl alcohol to the carbonyl group at position 17 adds the required carbon atoms for the future lactone [82543-17-7] (7). The alkyne bond is doubly reduced by catalytic hydrogenation [82543-18-8] (8). Pyridinium chlorochromate (PCC) mediated oxidation converts the primary alcohol to an acid while the secondary C3 alcohol is oxidized to a oxidized to a β-hydroxyketone (9). The carboxylic acid lactonizes to the gbl ring, while dehydration of the 5β-hydroxyl group leads to the conjugated enone (10). Dehydrogenation by means of DDQ introduces the C1=C2 olefin to afford spirorenone.

== See also ==
- Mespirenone
