= C23H32O4 =

The molecular formula C_{23}H_{32}O_{4} may refer to:

- Prorenoic acid
- Desoxycorticosterone acetate
- Hydroxyprogesterone acetate, an orally active progestin related to hydroxyprogesterone caproate
- Norgestomet, a progestin medication which is used in veterinary medicine
- THC methylcarbonate
