= Spiroxasone =

Chemical compound

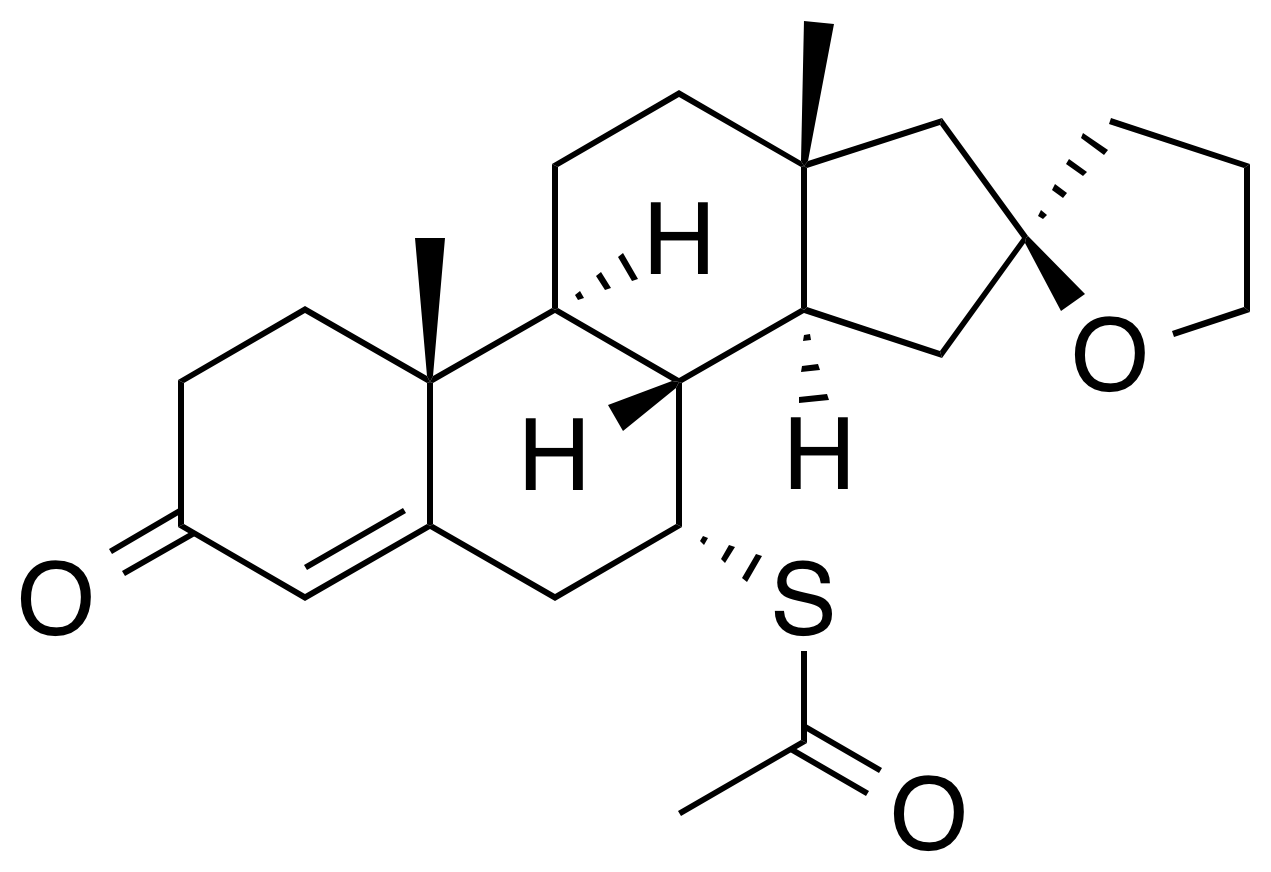

Clinical data
- Routes of administration: By mouth

Identifiers
- IUPAC name: S-[(7R,8R,9S,10R,13S,14S,17R)-10,13-dimethyl-3-oxospiro[2,6,7,8,9,11,12,14,15,16-decahydro-1H-cyclopenta[a]phenanthrene-17,2'-oxolane]-7-yl] ethanethioate
- CAS Number: 6673-97-8
- PubChem CID: 23141
- ChemSpider: 21652
- UNII: 8P0U2ZA1NQ
- KEGG: D05912
- ChEMBL: ChEMBL2105514
- CompTox Dashboard (EPA): DTXSID101024404

Chemical and physical data
- Formula: C_{24}H_{34}O_{3}S
- Molar mass: 402.59 g·mol^{−1}
- 3D model (JSmol): Interactive image
- SMILES: CC(=O)S[C@@H]1CC2=CC(=O)CC[C@@]2([C@@H]3[C@@H]1[C@@H]4CC[C@]5([C@]4(CC3)C)CCCO5)C
- InChI: InChI=1S/C24H34O3S/c1-15(25)28-20-14-16-13-17(26)5-9-22(16,2)18-6-10-23(3)19(21(18)20)7-11-24(23)8-4-12-27-24/h13,18-21H,4-12,14H2,1-3H3/t18-,19-,20+,21+,22-,23-,24-/m0/s1; Key:XKCGICBTWRNUCL-KIEAKMPYSA-N

Spiroxasone (INN, USAN) is a synthetic, steroidal antimineralocorticoid of the spirolactone group which was developed as a diuretic and antihypertensive agent but was never marketed. It was synthesized and assayed in 1963. The drug is 7α-acetylthiospirolactone with the ketone group removed from the C17α spirolactone ring. Similarly to other spirolactones like spironolactone, spiroxasone also possesses antiandrogen activity.
