= Mexrenoic acid =

Chemical compound

Clinical data
- Other names: Mexrenoate; 17-Hydroxy-3-oxopregn-4-ene-7,21-dicarboxylic acid 7-methyl ester
- Drug class: Antimineralocorticoid

Identifiers
- IUPAC name: 3-[(7R,8R,9S,10R,13S,14S,17R)-17-Hydroxy-7-methoxycarbonyl-10,13-dimethyl-3-oxo-2,6,7,8,9,11,12,14,15,16-decahydro-1H-cyclopenta[a]phenanthren-17-yl]propanoic acid
- CAS Number: 41020-68-2
- PubChem CID: 3033929
- ChemSpider: 2298500
- UNII: 2MN58RDC9D
- ChEMBL: ChEMBL2110977
- CompTox Dashboard (EPA): DTXSID50194004

Chemical and physical data
- Formula: C_{24}H_{34}O_{6}
- Molar mass: 418.530 g·mol^{−1}
- 3D model (JSmol): Interactive image
- SMILES: C[C@]12CCC(=O)C=C1C[C@H]([C@@H]3[C@@H]2CC[C@]4([C@H]3CC[C@]4(CCC(=O)O)O)C)C(=O)OC
- InChI: InChI=1S/C24H34O6/c1-22-8-4-15(25)12-14(22)13-16(21(28)30-3)20-17(22)5-9-23(2)18(20)6-10-24(23,29)11-7-19(26)27/h12,16-18,20,29H,4-11,13H2,1-3H3,(H,26,27)/t16-,17+,18+,20-,22+,23+,24-/m1/s1; Key:JBXXREPMUABISH-RGKMBJPFSA-N

Mexrenoic acid, or mexrenoate, is a synthetic steroidal antimineralocorticoid which was never marketed.

== See also ==
- Mexrenoate potassium
- Mexrenone
