= Mexrenone =

Chemical compound

Clinical data
- Other names: ZK-32055; SC-25152; 7α-(Methoxycarbonyl)canrenone; 17β-Hydroxy-3-oxo-17α-pregn-4-ene-7α,21-dicarboxylic acid γ-lactone methyl ester

Identifiers
- IUPAC name: methyl (7R,8R,9S,10R,13S,14S,17R)-10,13-dimethyl-3,5'-dioxospiro[2,6,7,8,9,11,12,14,15,16-decahydro-1H-cyclopenta[a]phenanthrene-17,2'-oxolane]-7-carboxylate
- CAS Number: 41020-65-9
- PubChem CID: 3082529
- ChemSpider: 10257997
- UNII: 16FTD41OAV
- CompTox Dashboard (EPA): DTXSID101045761

Chemical and physical data
- Formula: C_{24}H_{32}O_{5}
- Molar mass: 400.515 g·mol^{−1}
- 3D model (JSmol): Interactive image
- SMILES: COC(=O)[C@@H]4C\C1=C\C(=O)CC[C@]1(C)[C@H]5CC[C@@]3(C)[C@@H](CC[C@]23CCC(=O)O2)[C@H]45
- InChI: InChI=1S/C24H32O5/c1-22-8-4-15(25)12-14(22)13-16(21(27)28-3)20-17(22)5-9-23(2)18(20)6-10-24(23)11-7-19(26)29-24/h12,16-18,20H,4-11,13H2,1-3H3/t16-,17+,18+,20-,22+,23+,24-/m1/s1; Key:ADZYJDJNIBFOQE-RGKMBJPFSA-N

Mexrenone (code names ZK-32055, SC-25152) is a steroidal antimineralocorticoid of the spirolactone group related to spironolactone that was never marketed. It is the lactonic form of mexrenoic acid (mexrenoate), and mexrenoate potassium (SC-26714), the potassium salt of mexrenoic acid, also exists. In addition to the mineralocorticoid receptor, mexrenone also binds to the glucocorticoid, androgen, and progesterone receptors. Relative to spironolactone, it has markedly reduced antiandrogen activity (approximately one-tenth of the antimineralocorticoid dosage equivalent antiandrogen activity of spironolactone). Eplerenone is the 9-11α-epoxy analogue of mexrenone.

== See also ==
- Canrenone
- Mexrenoate potassium
- Mexrenoic acid
- Potassium canrenoate
- Prorenone
