= Prorenone =

Chemical compound

Clinical data
- Other names: SC-23133; 3-(17β-Hydroxy-6β,7β-methylene-3-oxo-4-androsten-17α-yl)propionic acid γ-lactone
- ATC code: None

Identifiers
- IUPAC name: (1aS,5aR,5bS,7aS,8R,10aS,10bR,10cS)-5a,7a-Dimethyl-1,1a,3',4,4',5,5a,5b,6,7,7a,9,10,10a,10b,10c-hexadecahydro-3H,5'H-spiro[cyclopenta[a]cyclopropa[l]phenanthrene-8,2'-furan]-3,5'-dione
- CAS Number: 49848-04-6
- PubChem CID: 170819
- IUPHAR/BPS: 2876
- ChemSpider: 149344
- UNII: Y7BZ8ZY6TJ
- CompTox Dashboard (EPA): DTXSID50964446

Chemical and physical data
- Formula: C_{23}H_{30}O_{3}
- Molar mass: 354.490 g·mol^{−1}
- 3D model (JSmol): Interactive image
- SMILES: O=C6O[C@@]5([C@@]3([C@H]([C@@H]2[C@H]4[C@@H](/C1=C/C(=O)CC[C@]1(C)[C@H]2CC3)C4)CC5)C)CC6
- InChI: InChI=1S/C23H30O3/c1-21-7-3-13(24)11-18(21)14-12-15(14)20-16(21)4-8-22(2)17(20)5-9-23(22)10-6-19(25)26-23/h11,14-17,20H,3-10,12H2,1-2H3/t14-,15+,16-,17-,20+,21+,22-,23+/m0/s1; Key:RRHHMFQGHCFGMH-LAPLKBAYSA-N

Prorenone (developmental code name SC-23133) is a steroidal antimineralocorticoid of the spirolactone group related to spironolactone that was never marketed. It is the lactonic form of prorenoic acid (prorenoate), and prorenoate potassium (SC-23992), the potassium salt of prorenoic acid, also exists. Prorenoate potassium is about 8 times more potent than spironolactone as an antimineralocorticoid in animals, and it may act as a prodrug to prorenone. In addition to the mineralocorticoid receptor, prorenone also binds to the glucocorticoid, androgen, and progesterone receptors. The antiandrogenic potency of prorenone in vivo in animals is close to that of spironolactone. Similarly to spironolactone, prorenone is also a potent inhibitor of aldosterone biosynthesis.

== Chemistry ==
=== Synthesis ===
Prorenone can be synthesized via a Johnson–Corey–Chaykovsky reaction by reaction of canrenone with trimethylsulfoxonium iodide and sodium hydride.

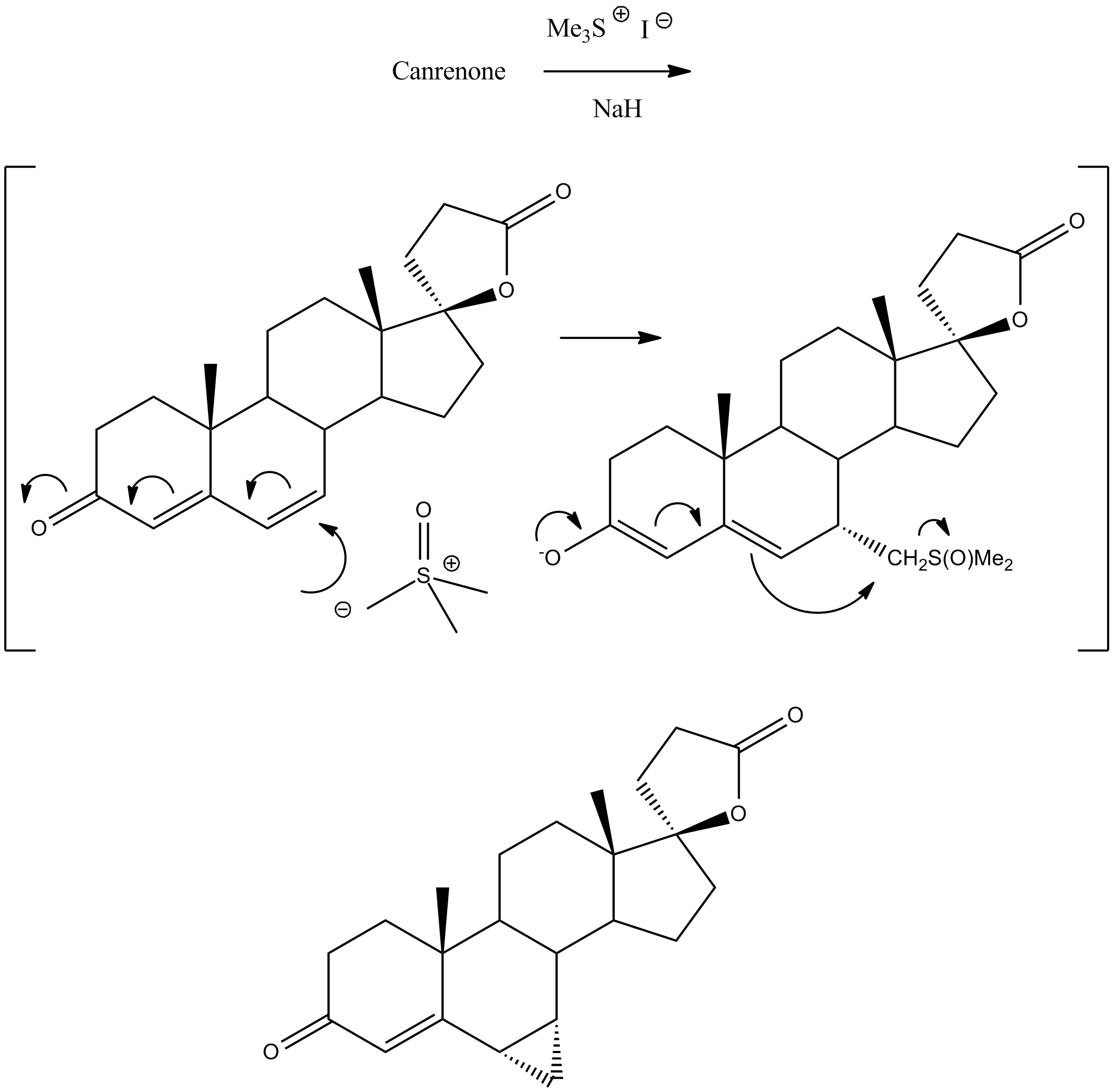

== See also ==
- Canrenone
- Mexrenone
- Prorenoate potassium
- Prorenoic acid
- Potassium canrenoate
