= Dicirenone =

Chemical compound

Clinical data
- Other names: SC-26304; 7α-Carboxyisopropylspirolactone; 17α-Hydroxy-3-oxopregn-4-ene-7α,21-dicarboxylic acid γ-lactone 1-isopropyl ester
- Routes of administration: Oral

Identifiers
- IUPAC name: Propan-2-yl (7R,8R,9S,10R,13S,14S,17R)-10,13-Dimethyl-3,5'-dioxospiro[2,6,7,8,9,11,12,14,15,16-decahydro-1H-cyclopenta[a]phenanthrene-17,2'-oxolane]-7-carboxylate
- CAS Number: 41020-79-5
- PubChem CID: 10387872
- ChemSpider: 8563314
- UNII: M8K306YKSX
- KEGG: D03792
- ChEMBL: ChEMBL2106258
- CompTox Dashboard (EPA): DTXSID101023456

Chemical and physical data
- Formula: C_{26}H_{36}O_{5}
- Molar mass: 428.569 g·mol^{−1}
- 3D model (JSmol): Interactive image
- SMILES: CC(C)OC(=O)[C@@H]1CC2=CC(=O)CC[C@@]2([C@@H]3[C@@H]1[C@@H]4CC[C@]5([C@]4(CC3)C)CCC(=O)O5)C
- InChI: InChI=1S/C26H36O5/c1-15(2)30-23(29)18-14-16-13-17(27)5-9-24(16,3)19-6-10-25(4)20(22(18)19)7-11-26(25)12-8-21(28)31-26/h13,15,18-20,22H,5-12,14H2,1-4H3/t18-,19+,20+,22-,24+,25+,26-/m1/s1; Key:WUVPAYPBMZMHJO-IMNLCBETSA-N

Dicirenone (INN, USAN; developmental code name SC-26304; also known as 7α-carboxyisopropylspirolactone) is a synthetic, steroidal antimineralocorticoid of the spirolactone group which was developed as a diuretic and antihypertensive agent but was never marketed. It was synthesized and assayed in 1974. Similarly to other spirolactones like spironolactone, dicirenone also possesses antiandrogen activity, albeit with relatively reduced affinity.
