= SC-5233 =

Chemical compound

Clinical data
- Other names: 6,7-Dihydrocanrenone; 7-Desthioacetylspironolactone; 20-Spirox-4-ene-3,20-dione
- Routes of administration: By mouth
- Drug class: Antimineralocorticoid; Progestogen; Steroidal antiandrogen
- ATC code: None

Identifiers
- IUPAC name: (8R,9S,10R,13S,14S,17R)-10,13-dimethylspiro[2,6,7,8,9,11,12,14,15,16-decahydro-1H-cyclopenta[a]phenanthrene-17,5'-oxolane]-2',3-dione
- CAS Number: 976-70-5
- PubChem CID: 101931
- ChemSpider: 92091
- UNII: 3N8TCN29OP
- ChEMBL: ChEMBL400534
- CompTox Dashboard (EPA): DTXSID10875403
- ECHA InfoCard: 100.012.321

Chemical and physical data
- Formula: C_{22}H_{30}O_{3}
- Molar mass: 342.479 g·mol^{−1}
- 3D model (JSmol): Interactive image
- SMILES: CC12CCC(=O)C=C1CCC3C2CCC4(C3CCC45CCC(=O)O5)C
- InChI: InChI=1S/C22H30O3/c1-20-9-5-15(23)13-14(20)3-4-16-17(20)6-10-21(2)18(16)7-11-22(21)12-8-19(24)25-22/h13,16-18H,3-12H2,1-2H3/t16-,17+,18+,20+,21+,22-/m1/s1; Key:UWBICEKKOYXZRG-WNHSNXHDSA-N

SC-5233, also known as 6,7-dihydrocanrenone or 20-spirox-4-ene-3,20-dione, is a synthetic, steroidal antimineralocorticoid of the spirolactone group which was developed by G. D. Searle & Company in the 1950s but was never marketed. It was the first synthetic antagonist of the mineralocorticoid receptor to have been identified and tested in humans. The drug was found to lack appreciable oral bioavailability and to be of low potency when administered parenterally, but it nonetheless produced a mild diuretic effect in patients with congestive heart failure. SC-8109, the 19-nor (19-demethyl) analogue, was developed and found to have improved oral bioavailability and potency, but still had low potency. Spironolactone (SC-9420; Aldactone) followed and had both good oral bioavailability and potency, and was the first synthetic antimineralocorticoid to be marketed. It has about 46-fold higher oral potency than SC-5233.

SC-5233 is the propionic acid lactone of testosterone (androst-4-en-17β-ol-3-one) and is also known 3-(3-oxo-17β-hydroxyandrost-4-en-17α-yl)propionic acid γ-lactone or as 17α-(2-carboxyethyl)testosterone γ-lactone. It is the unsubstituted parent or prototype compound of the spirolactone family of steroidal antimineralocorticoids.

Similarly to other spirolactones like canrenone and spironolactone, SC-5233 has some antiandrogenic activity and antagonizes the effects of testosterone in animals. In addition, along with SC-8109, it has been found to possess potent progestogenic activity.

Chemical structures of spirolactones
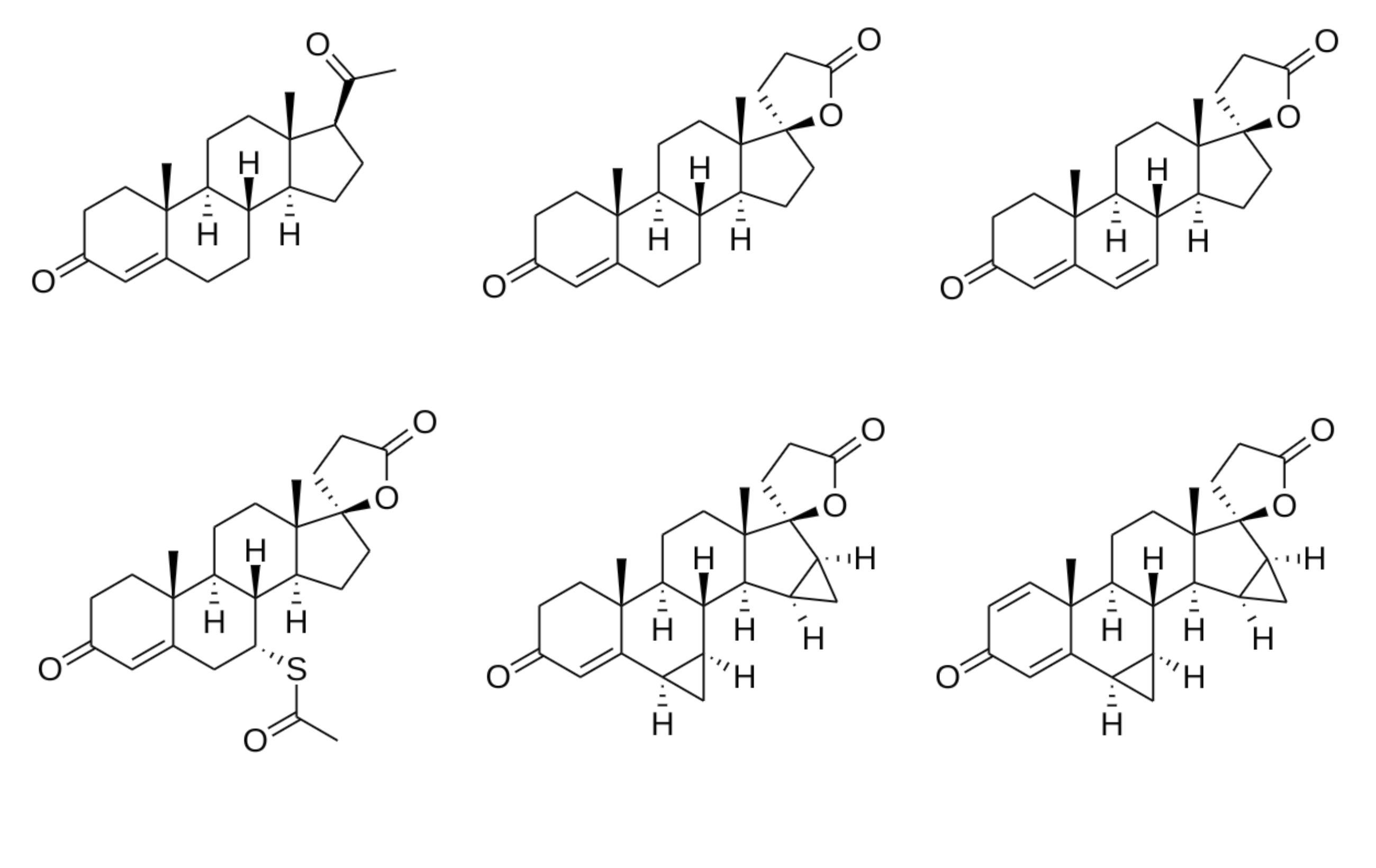
Chemical structures of progesterone and spirolactones (steroid-17α-spirolactones).
