= Altizide =

Names
- IUPAC name (3R)-3-[(Allylsulfanyl)methyl]-6-chloro-3,4-dihydro-2H-1,2,4-benzothiadiazine-7-sulfonamide 1,1-dioxide
- Other names: Althiazide; CB 8093; P 1779; Altizidum

Identifiers
CAS Number	5588-16-9
3D model (JSmol)	Interactive image; Interactive image
ChEMBL	ChEMBL599870
ChemSpider	5036613
ECHA InfoCard	100.024.541
KEGG	D02838
PubChem CID	6604323; 2122
UNII	GI8CB72B0D
CompTox Dashboard (EPA)	DTXSID3045857
- InChI: InChI=1S/C11H14ClN3O4S3/c1-2-3-20-6-11-14-8-4-7(12)9(21(13,16)17)5-10(8)22(18,19)15-11/h2,4-5,11,14-15H,1,3,6H2,(H2,13,16,17)/t11-/m1/s1 Key: VGLGVJVUHYTIIU-LLVKDONJSA-N; InChI=1/C11H14ClN3O4S3/c1-2-3-20-6-11-14-8-4-7(12)9(21(13,16)17)5-10(8)22(18,19)15-11/h2,4-5,11,14-15H,1,3,6H2,(H2,13,16,17)/t11-/m1/s1 Key: VGLGVJVUHYTIIU-LLVKDONJBT
- SMILES: O=S(=O)(c1c(Cl)cc2c(c1)S(=O)(=O)N[C@@H](N2)CSC\C=C)N; C=CCSCC1NC2=CC(=C(C=C2S(=O)(=O)N1)S(=O)(=O)N)Cl

Properties
Chemical formula	C_{11}H_{14}ClN_{3}O_{4}S_{3}
Molar mass	383.89456
Density	1.502 g/mL
Boiling point	625.8 °C (1,158.4 °F; 898.9 K)
- Except where otherwise noted, data are given for materials in their standard state (at 25 °C [77 °F], 100 kPa). verify (what is ?) Infobox references

Altizide is a thiazide diuretic. In combination with spironolactone it is sold under the brand name of Aldactacine and Aldactazine by Pfizer and other names by other companies.
