= SC-8109 =

Chemical compound

Clinical data
- Other names: 19-Norspirolactone; 19-Nor-17α-(2-carboxyethyl)testosterone γ-lactone; 3-Oxo-17β-hydroxyestr-4-ene-17-propanoic acid lactone; 17-Hydroxy-3-oxo-19-Nor-17α-pregn-4-ene-21-carboxylic acid γ-lactone

Identifiers
- IUPAC name: (8R,9S,10R,13S,14S,17R)-13-Methylspiro[1,2,6,7,8,9,10,11,12,14,15,16-dodecahydrocyclopenta[a]phenanthrene-17,5'-oxolane]-2',3-dione
- CAS Number: 1722-54-9
- PubChem CID: 168943
- ChemSpider: 147774
- CompTox Dashboard (EPA): DTXSID501337091

Chemical and physical data
- Formula: C_{21}H_{28}O_{3}
- Molar mass: 328.452 g·mol^{−1}
- 3D model (JSmol): Interactive image
- SMILES: C[C@]12CC[C@H]3[C@H]([C@@H]1CC[C@@]24CCC(=O)O4)CCC5=CC(=O)CC[C@H]35
- InChI: InChI=1S/C21H28O3/c1-20-9-6-16-15-5-3-14(22)12-13(15)2-4-17(16)18(20)7-10-21(20)11-8-19(23)24-21/h12,15-18H,2-11H2,1H3/t15-,16+,17+,18-,20-,21+/m0/s1; Key:CXXAIOQMCGJVHT-XUJOMZSTSA-N

SC-8109 is a steroidal antimineralocorticoid of the spirolactone group which was never marketed. It is a potent antagonist of the mineralocorticoid receptor and is more potent than the related drug SC-5233 (of which SC-8109 is the 19-nor analogue). However, SC-8109 was found to have relatively low oral bioavailability and potency, though it nonetheless produced a mild diuretic effect in patients with congestive heart failure. Spironolactone (SC-9420; Aldactone), another spirolactone, followed and had both good oral bioavailability and potency, and was the first antimineralocorticoid to be marketed.

In addition to its antimineralocorticoid activity, SC-8109 shows potent progestogenic activity, with similar potency relative to that of progesterone. Its analogue, SC-5233, possesses similar but less potent progestogenic activity. In addition, SC-5233 has been assessed and found to possess some antiandrogenic activity, antagonizing the effects of testosterone in animals, and SC-8109 may as well.

Relative affinities (%) of SC-8109 and related steroids
Compound	PR	AR	ER	GR	MR	SHBG	CBG
Progesterone	100	3–10	<1	<1	3–10	?	?
SC-8109	191	25–50	<1	<1	15–25	?	?
Values are percentages (%). Reference ligands (100%) were progesterone for the PR, testosterone for the AR, estradiol for the ER, DEXA for the GR, and aldosterone for the MR.

== See also ==
- Canrenone
