= Mexrenoate potassium =

Chemical compound

Clinical data
- Other names: SC-26714; 7-Methyl 17-hydroxy-3-oxopregn-4-ene-7,21-dicarboxylate monopotassium salt
- Drug class: Antimineralocorticoid

Identifiers
- IUPAC name: Potassium 3-[(7R,8R,9S,10R,13S,14S,17R)-17-hydroxy-7-methoxycarbonyl-10,13-dimethyl-3-oxo-2,6,7,8,9,11,12,14,15,16-decahydro-1H-cyclopenta[a]phenanthren-17-yl]propanoate
- CAS Number: 41020-67-1
- PubChem CID: 23667632
- ChemSpider: 58288
- UNII: AZR13V2X75
- ChEMBL: ChEMBL2106906

Chemical and physical data
- Formula: C_{24}H_{33}KO_{6}
- Molar mass: 456.620 g·mol^{−1}
- 3D model (JSmol): Interactive image
- SMILES: C[C@]12CCC(=O)C=C1C[C@H]([C@@H]3[C@@H]2CC[C@]4([C@H]3CC[C@]4(CCC(=O)[O-])O)C)C(=O)OC.[K+]
- InChI: InChI=1S/C24H34O6.K/c1-22-8-4-15(25)12-14(22)13-16(21(28)30-3)20-17(22)5-9-23(2)18(20)6-10-24(23,29)11-7-19(26)27;/h12,16-18,20,29H,4-11,13H2,1-3H3,(H,26,27);/q;+1/p-1/t16-,17+,18+,20-,22+,23+,24-;/m1./s1; Key:FYLPNLCXMZDAEE-CKPGHUGTSA-M

Mexrenoate potassium (developmental code name SC-26714) is a synthetic steroidal antimineralocorticoid which was never marketed.

== See also ==
- Mexrenoic acid
- Mexrenone
