= Thiol S-methyltransferase =

thiol S-methyltransferase

Identifiers
- EC no.: 2.1.1.9
- CAS no.: 9029-81-6

Databases
- IntEnz: IntEnz view
- BRENDA: BRENDA entry
- ExPASy: NiceZyme view
- KEGG: KEGG entry
- MetaCyc: metabolic pathway
- PRIAM: profile
- PDB structures: RCSB PDB PDBe PDBsum
- Gene Ontology: AmiGO / QuickGO
Search
- PMC: articles
- PubMed: articles
- NCBI: proteins

In enzymology, a thiol S-methyltransferase (EC 2.1.1.9) is an enzyme that catalyzes the chemical reaction

S-adenosyl-L-methionine + a thiol $\rightleftharpoons$ S-adenosyl-L-homocysteine + a thioether

Thus, the two substrates of this enzyme are S-adenosyl methionine and thiol, whereas its two products are S-adenosylhomocysteine and thioether.

This enzyme belongs to the family of transferases, specifically those transferring one-carbon group methyltransferases. The systematic name of this enzyme class is S-adenosyl-L-methionine:thiol S-methyltransferase. Other names in common use include S-methyltransferase, thiol methyltransferase, and TMT. This enzyme participates in selenoamino acid metabolism.
