= Prorenoate potassium =

Chemical compound

Clinical data
- Other names: SC-23992; 6α,7α-Dihydro-17-hydroxy-3-oxo-3'H-cyclopropa(6,7)-17α-pregna-4,6-diene-21-carboxylic acid monopotassium salt
- Drug class: Antimineralocorticoid

Identifiers
- IUPAC name: Potassium 3-[(1aR,5aR,5bS,7aS,8R,10aS,10bR,10cR)-8-hydroxy-5a,7a-dimethyl-3-oxo-1,1a,3,4,5,5a,5b,6,7,7a,8,9,10,10a,10b,10c-hexadecahydrocyclopenta[a]cyclopropa[l]phenanthren-8-yl]propanoate
- CAS Number: 49847-97-4
- PubChem CID: 23667640
- ChemSpider: 58901
- UNII: T2D4XUS623
- KEGG: D05640
- ChEMBL: ChEMBL2107002
- CompTox Dashboard (EPA): DTXSID90964445

Chemical and physical data
- Formula: C_{23}H_{31}KO_{4}
- Molar mass: 410.595 g·mol^{−1}
- 3D model (JSmol): Interactive image
- SMILES: C[C@]12CCC(=O)C=C1[C@@H]3C[C@@H]3[C@@H]4[C@@H]2CC[C@]5([C@H]4CC[C@]5(CCC(=O)[O-])O)C.[K+]
- InChI: InChI=1S/C23H32O4.K/c1-21-7-3-13(24)11-18(21)14-12-15(14)20-16(21)4-8-22(2)17(20)5-9-23(22,27)10-6-19(25)26;/h11,14-17,20,27H,3-10,12H2,1-2H3,(H,25,26);/q;+1/p-1/t14-,15+,16+,17+,20-,21-,22+,23-;/m1./s1; Key:NLSAMWIBIQWHTK-CZKUEYQYSA-M

Prorenoate potassium (developmental code name SC-23992) is a synthetic steroidal antimineralocorticoid which was never marketed.

== See also ==
- Prorenoic acid
- Prorenone
