= Mespirenone =

Chemical compound

Clinical data
- Routes of administration: Oral
- ATC code: None

Identifiers
- IUPAC name: S-[(4aR,4bS,6aS,7S,7aS,8aS,8bS,8cR,9R)-4a,6a-Dimethyl-2,5'-dioxo-2,4',4b,5,5',6,6a,7a,8,8a,8b,8c,9,10-tetradecahydro-3'H,4aH-spiro[cyclopropa[4,5]cyclopenta[1,2-a]phenanthrene-7,2'-furan]-9-yl]ethane thioate
- CAS Number: 87952-98-5
- PubChem CID: 65660
- ChemSpider: 59095
- UNII: E91TME2I23
- ChEMBL: ChEMBL1908314
- CompTox Dashboard (EPA): DTXSID40868989

Chemical and physical data
- Formula: C_{25}H_{30}O_{4}S
- Molar mass: 426.57 g·mol^{−1}
- 3D model (JSmol): Interactive image
- SMILES: CC(=O)SC1CC2=CC(=O)C=CC2(C3C1C4C5CC5C6(C4(CC3)C)CCC(=O)O6)C
- InChI: InChI=1S/C25H30O4S/c1-13(26)30-19-11-14-10-15(27)4-7-23(14,2)17-5-8-24(3)22(21(17)19)16-12-18(16)25(24)9-6-20(28)29-25/h4,7,10,16-19,21-22H,5-6,8-9,11-12H2,1-3H3/t16-,17+,18+,19-,21+,22+,23+,24+,25+/m1/s1; Key:CPHJTSJQUQZOLJ-ISIDMKFXSA-N

Mespirenone (INN; developmental code ZK-94679; also known as Δ^{1}-15β,16β-methylenespironolactone) is a steroidal antimineralocorticoid of the spirolactone group related to spironolactone that was never marketed. Animal research found that it was 3.3-fold more potent as an antimineralocorticoid relative to spironolactone. In addition to its antimineralocorticoid properties, mespirenone is also a progestogen, antigonadotropin, and antiandrogen. It is 2- to 3-fold as potent as spironolactone as a progestogen and antigonadotropin but its antiandrogenic activity is markedly reduced and weak (though still of significance) in comparison. Mespirenone is also a potent and specific enzyme inhibitor of 18-hydroxylase and thus of mineralocorticoid biosynthesis. The drug was under development by Schering (now Bayer Schering Pharma) and reached phase II clinical trials but was discontinued in 1989.

== See also ==
- Canrenone
- Drospirenone
- Spironolactone
