= Prorenoic acid =

Chemical compound

Clinical data
- Other names: Prorenoate; 6α,7α-Dihydro-17-hydroxy-3-oxo-3'H-cyclopropa(6,7)-17α-pregna-4,6-diene-21-carboxylic acid
- Drug class: Antimineralocorticoid

Identifiers
- IUPAC name: 3-[(1R,2R,4R,10R,11S,14S,15R,18S)-15-Hydroxy-10,14-dimethyl-7-oxopentacyclo[9.7.0.0^{2},^{4}.0^{5,10}.0^{14,18}]octadec-5-en-15-yl]propanoate
- CAS Number: 49848-01-3
- UNII: WET36J3301
- CompTox Dashboard (EPA): DTXSID401023631

Chemical and physical data
- Formula: C_{23}H_{31}O_{4}
- Molar mass: 371.497 g·mol^{−1}
- 3D model (JSmol): Interactive image
- SMILES: O([H])[C@](CCC(=O)[O-])1CC[C@@]([H])2[C@]1(C)CC[C@@]([H])1[C@](C)3CCC(C=C3[C@@]([H])3C[C@]3([H])[C@@]21[H])=O
- InChI: InChI=1S/C23H32O4/c1-21-7-3-13(24)11-18(21)14-12-15(14)20-16(21)4-8-22(2)17(20)5-9-23(22,27)10-6-19(25)26/h11,14-17,20,27H,3-10,12H2,1-2H3,(H,25,26)/p-1/t14-,15+,16+,17+,20-,21-,22+,23-/m1/s1; Key:OHZWNMVYJJTNKU-VAFIVCJBSA-M

Prorenoic acid, or prorenoate, is a synthetic steroidal antimineralocorticoid which was never marketed.

== See also ==
- Prorenoate potassium
- Prorenone
