= Gonadotropin-releasing hormone receptor =

G-protein coupled receptor

Identifiers
- Symbol: GNRHR
- Alt. symbols: GnRH-R; LRHR;
- NCBI gene: 2798
- HGNC: 4421
- OMIM: 138850
- RefSeq: NM_000406
- UniProt: P30968

Other data
- Locus: Chr. 4 q21.2
Search for
- Structures: Swiss-model
- Domains: InterPro

Gonadotropin-releasing hormone (type 2) receptor 2

Identifiers
- Symbol: GNRHR2
- NCBI gene: 114814
- HGNC: 16341
- RefSeq: NR_002328
- UniProt: Q96P88

Other data
- Locus: Chr. 1 q12
Search for
- Structures: Swiss-model
- Domains: InterPro

The gonadotropin-releasing hormone receptor (GnRHR), also known as the luteinizing hormone releasing hormone receptor (LHRHR), is a member of the seven-transmembrane, G-protein coupled receptor (GPCR) family. It is the receptor of gonadotropin-releasing hormone (GnRH). Agonist binding to the GnRH receptor activates the Gq/11 family of heterotrimeric G proteins. The GnRHR is expressed on the surface of pituitary gonadotrope cells as well as lymphocytes, breast, ovary, and prostate.

This receptor is a 60 kDa G protein-coupled receptor and resides primarily in the pituitary and is responsible for eliciting the actions of GnRH after its release from the hypothalamus. Upon activation, the LHRHr stimulates tyrosine phosphatase and elicits the release of LH from the pituitary.

Evidence exists showing the presence of GnRH and its receptor in extrapituitary tissues as well as a role in progression of some cancers.

== Function ==
Following binding of GnRH, the GnRHR associates with G-proteins that activate a phosphatidylinositol (PtdIns)-calcium second messenger system. Activation of the GnRHR ultimately causes the release of follicle stimulating hormone (FSH) and luteinizing hormone (LH).

== Genes ==
There are two major forms of the GNRHR, each encoded by a separate gene (GNRHR and GNRHR2).

Alternative splicing of the GNRHR gene, GNRHR, results in multiple transcript variants encoding different isoforms. More than 18 transcription initiation sites in the 5' region and multiple polyA signals in the 3' region have been identified for GNRHR.

== Regulation ==
The GnRHR responds to GnRH as well as to synthetic GnRH agonists. Agonists stimulate the receptor, however prolonged exposure leads to a downregulation effect resulting in hypogonadism, an effect that is often medically utilized. GnRH antagonists block the receptor and inhibit gonadotropin release. GnRHRs are further regulated by the presence of sex hormones as well as activin and inhibin.

== Ligands ==
=== Agonists ===
==== Peptides ====
- Azagly-nafarelin
- Buserelin
- Deslorelin
- Fertirelin
- GnRH
- Gonadorelin
- Goserelin
- Histrelin
- Lecirelin
- Leuprorelin
- Nafarelin
- Peforelin
- Triptorelin

=== Antagonists ===
==== Peptides ====
- Abarelix
- Cetrorelix
- Degarelix
- Ganirelix
- Ozarelix

==== Non-peptides ====
- Elagolix
- Linzagolix
- Opigolix
- Relugolix
- Sufugolix

=== Pharmacoperones ===
Current research is looking into pharmacoperones, or chemical chaparones that promote the shuttling of mature Gonadotropin-releasing hormone receptor (GNRHR) protein to the cell surface, leading to a functional protein. Gonadotropin-releasing hormone receptor function has been shown to be deleteriously effected by point mutations in its gene. Some of these mutations, when expressed, cause the receptor to remain in the cytosol. An approach to rescue receptor function utilizes pharmacoperones or molecular chaperones, which are typically small molecules that rescue misfolded proteins to the cell surface. These interact with the receptor to restore cognate receptor function devoid of antagonist or agonist activity. This approach, when effective, should increase therapeutic reach. Pharmacoperones have been identified that restore function of Gonadotropin-releasing hormone receptor.

== Clinical implications ==
Defects in the GnRHR are a cause of hypogonadotropic hypogonadism (HH).

Normal puberty begins between ages 8 and 14 in girls and between 9 and 14 in boys. Puberty, however, for some children can come much sooner (precocious puberty) or much later (delayed puberty). In some cases puberty never occurs and thereby contributes to the estimated 35-70 million infertile couples worldwide. Among children, the abnormally early or late onset of puberty exerts intense emotional and social stress that too often goes untreated.

The timely onset of puberty is regulated by many factors and one factor that is often referred to as the master regulator of puberty and reproduction is GnRH. This peptide hormone is produced in the hypothalamus but gets secreted and acts upon GnRHRs in the anterior pituitary to exert its effects on reproductive maturation.

Understanding how GnRHR functions has been key to developing clinical strategies to treat reproductive-related disorders.

== See also ==
- GnRH modulator
