= Buserelin =

Chemical compound

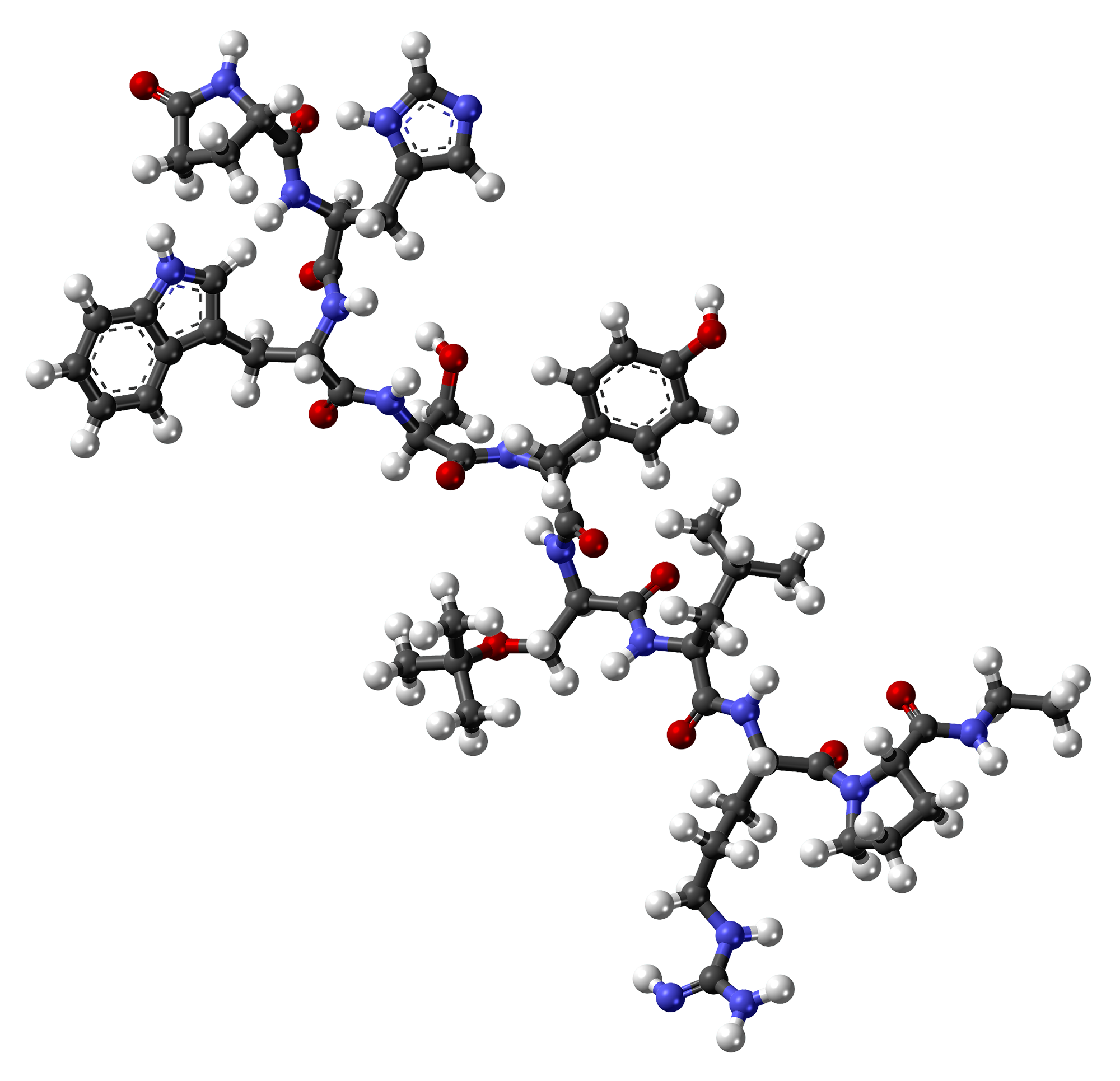

Clinical data
- Trade names: Suprefact, others
- Other names: Etilamide; HOE-766; HOE-766A; ICI-123215; S-746766; D-Ser(tBu)^{6}EA^{10}-LHRH; 6-[O-(1,1-Dimethylethyl)-D-serine]-9-(N-ethyl-L-prolinamide)-10-deglycinamide-LHRH (pig)
- AHFS/Drugs.com: Micromedex Detailed Consumer Information
- Pregnancy category: X
- Routes of administration: Nasal spray, subcutaneous injection, subcutaneous implant
- Drug class: GnRH analogue; GnRH agonist; Antigonadotropin
- ATC code: L02AE01 (WHO) QH01CA90 (WHO)

Legal status
- Legal status: In general: ℞ (Prescription only)

Pharmacokinetic data
- Bioavailability: Oral: ineffective Intranasal: 2.5–3.3% Subcutaneous: 70%
- Protein binding: 15%
- Metabolism: Liver, kidneys, gastrointestinal tract (pyroglutamyl peptidase, chymotrypsin-like endopeptidase)
- Metabolites: Buserelin (1–5)
- Elimination half-life: Intravenous: 50–80 min Subcutaneous: 80 min Intranasal: 1–2 hours
- Excretion: Urine, bile

Identifiers
- IUPAC name: (2S)-N-[(2S)-1-[[(2S)-1-[[(2S)-1-[[(2S)-1-[[(2R)-1-[[(2S)-1-[[(2S)-5-(diaminomethylideneamino)-1-[(2S)-2-(ethylcarbamoyl)pyrrolidin-1-yl]-1-oxopentan-2-yl]amino]-4-methyl-1-oxopentan-2-yl]amino]-3-[(2-methylpropan-2-yl)oxy]-1-oxopropan-2-yl]amino]-3-(4-hydroxyphenyl)-1-oxopropan-2-yl]amino]-3-hydroxy-1-oxopropan-2-yl]amino]-3-(1H-indol-3-yl)-1-oxopropan-2-yl]amino]-3-(1H-imidazol-5-yl)-1-oxopropan-2-yl]-5-oxopyrrolidine-2-carboxamide
- CAS Number: 57982-77-1 68630-75-1 (acetate)
- PubChem CID: 50225
- IUPHAR/BPS: 3860
- DrugBank: DB06719
- ChemSpider: 45545
- UNII: PXW8U3YXDV
- ChEBI: CHEBI:135907
- ChEMBL: ChEMBL2110824
- CompTox Dashboard (EPA): DTXSID301024155
- ECHA InfoCard: 100.055.493

Chemical and physical data
- Formula: C_{60}H_{86}N_{16}O_{13}
- Molar mass: 1239.447 g·mol^{−1}
- 3D model (JSmol): Interactive image
- SMILES: CCNC(=O)[C@@H]1CCCN1C(=O)[C@H](CCCNC(=N)N)NC(=O)[C@H](CC(C)C)NC(=O)[C@@H](COC(C)(C)C)NC(=O)[C@H](Cc2ccc(cc2)O)NC(=O)[C@H](CO)NC(=O)[C@H](Cc3c[nH]c4c3cccc4)NC(=O)[C@H](Cc5cnc[nH]5)NC(=O)[C@@H]6CCC(=O)N6
- InChI: InChI=1S/C60H86N16O13/c1-7-64-57(87)48-15-11-23-76(48)58(88)41(14-10-22-65-59(61)62)69-51(81)42(24-33(2)3)70-56(86)47(31-89-60(4,5)6)75-52(82)43(25-34-16-18-37(78)19-17-34)71-55(85)46(30-77)74-53(83)44(26-35-28-66-39-13-9-8-12-38(35)39)72-54(84)45(27-36-29-63-32-67-36)73-50(80)40-20-21-49(79)68-40/h8-9,12-13,16-19,28-29,32-33,40-48,66,77-78H,7,10-11,14-15,20-27,30-31H2,1-6H3,(H,63,67)(H,64,87)(H,68,79)(H,69,81)(H,70,86)(H,71,85)(H,72,84)(H,73,80)(H,74,83)(H,75,82)(H4,61,62,65)/t40-,41-,42-,43-,44-,45-,46-,47+,48-/m0/s1; Key:CUWODFFVMXJOKD-UVLQAERKSA-N

Buserelin, sold under the brand name Suprefact among others, is a medication which is used primarily in the treatment of prostate cancer and endometriosis. It is also used for other indications such as the treatment of premenopausal breast cancer, uterine fibroids, and early puberty, in assisted reproduction for female infertility, and as a part of transgender hormone therapy. In addition, buserelin is used in veterinary medicine. The medication is typically used as a nasal spray three times per day, but is also available for use as a solution or implant for injection into fat.

Side effects of buserelin are related to sex hormone deprivation and include symptoms of low testosterone levels and low estrogen levels such as hot flashes, sexual dysfunction, vaginal atrophy, and osteoporosis. Buserelin is a gonadotropin-releasing hormone agonist (GnRH agonist) and works by preventing the production of sex hormones by the gonads. It can lower sex hormone levels by about 95% in both sexes. Buserelin is a peptide and an analogue of GnRH.

Buserelin was first patented in 1974 and approved for medical use in 1985. It is not available in the United States, but is marketed widely elsewhere in the world, including in the United Kingdom, Canada, and many other countries. The medication is one of only two medically used GnRH analogues that are available as nasal sprays, the other being nafarelin. Buserelin is available as a generic medication.

== Medical uses ==
Buserelin is approved for the treatment of hormone-responsive cancers including prostate cancer and premenopausal breast cancer, sex hormone-dependent uterine diseases including endometrial hyperplasia, endometriosis, and uterine fibroids, and in assisted reproduction for female infertility. It is also used off-label for the treatment of precocious puberty, as a puberty blocker in transgender children, and as a component of transgender hormone therapy. In ovulation induction, buserelin is used for pituitary suppression as an adjunct to gonadotropin administration. It has also been assessed as a nasal spray for use as a hormonal contraceptive in women, with a 96% anovulation rate.

=== Dosages ===
For prostate cancer, the dosage of buserelin by subcutaneous injection is 500 μg three times per day (once every 8 hours, 1,500 μg/day total) for one week and then 200 μg once daily thereafter. If buserelin is used as a nasal spray, the dosage for prostate cancer is 800 μg sprayed into the nostrils three times per day (once every 8 hours, 2,400 μg/day total) for one week followed by 400 μg sprayed into the nostrils three times per day (once every 8 hours, 1,200 μg/day total) thereafter. For endometriosis, buserelin is used specifically as a nasal spray and the dosage is the same as that used for prostate cancer. These dosages of buserelin for both subcutaneous injection and nasal spray have been found to decrease testosterone levels to near-castrate levels in men with prostate cancer, although suppression was more complete with subcutaneous injection presumably due to suboptimal absorption with intranasal administration.

=== Available forms ===
Buserelin is available in the form of a 1 mg/mL solution for use as a nasal spray or subcutaneous injection once every 8 hours (three times per day) and as 6.3 mg and 9.45 mg implants for subcutaneous injection once every two and three months, respectively.

== Contraindications ==
Contraindications of buserelin include the following:

- Hypersensitivity to buserelin or any of the other components of the medication (case reports of anaphylaxis exist)
- Prostate cancer that is not hormone-dependent (as there will be no benefit from testosterone suppression)
- Individuals who have undergone gonadectomy (as hormone levels will not be affected)
- Pregnancy and breastfeeding (unknown whether buserelin might be teratogenic)
- Undiagnosed abnormal vaginal bleeding

== Side effects ==
During the initial phase of the therapy, before GnRH receptors have been significantly downregulated, testosterone levels are increased. This can lead to transient tumor activation with bone pain (in patients with cancer metastases) and urinary retention. Side effects that occur later during the treatment are mainly due to low sex hormone levels and include reduced libido, erectile dysfunction, hot flashes, vaginal dryness, vaginal atrophy, menorrhagia, osteoporosis, depression, asthenia, emotional lability, headache, dizziness, and application site reactions.

== Overdose ==
Buserelin appears to be safe in the event of an overdose.

== Pharmacology ==
=== Pharmacodynamics ===
Buserelin is a GnRH agonist, or an agonist of the GnRH receptor. It is a superagonist of the GnRH receptor with potency for induction of luteinizing hormone (LH) and follicle-stimulating hormone (FSH) secretion of about 20 to 170 times that of GnRH itself. By activating the GnRH receptor in the pituitary gland, buserelin induces the secretion of LH and FSH from the gonadotrophs of the anterior pituitary, which travel to the gonads through the bloodstream and activate gonadal sex hormone production as well as stimulate spermatogenesis in men and induce ovulation in women.

With chronic administration of buserelin however, the GnRH receptor becomes desensitized and completely stops responding both to buserelin and to endogenous GnRH. This is because GnRH is normally released from the hypothalamus in pulses, which keeps the GnRH receptor sensitive, whereas chronic buserelin administration results in more constant exposure and desensitization of the receptor. The profound desensitization of the GnRH receptor results in a loss of LH and FSH secretion from the anterior pituitary and a consequent shutdown of gonadal sex hormone production, markedly diminished or abolished spermatogenesis in men, and anovulation in women.

In men, approximately 95% of circulating testosterone is produced by the testes, with the remaining 5% being derived from the adrenal glands. In accordance, GnRH analogues like buserelin can reduce testosterone levels by about 95% in men. Sex hormone levels, including those of estradiol and progesterone, are similarly profoundly suppressed in premenopausal women. The suppression of estradiol levels is 95% and progesterone levels are less than 1 ng/mL (normal range during the luteal phase approximately 10–20 ng/mL); the resulting levels are equivalent to those in postmenopausal women.

Buserelin has been found to suppress testosterone levels in men with prostate cancer from 426 ng/dL to 28 ng/dL (by 93.4%) with 200 μg by subcutaneous injection once per day and from 521 ng/dL to 53 ng/dL (by 89.8%) with 400 μg by nasal spray once every 8 hours (1,200 μg/day total). The difference in suppression may have been due to poor compliance. A few small studies have also assessed the suppression of testosterone levels with buserelin nasal spray twice a day instead of three times a day. One such study found that testosterone levels in men with prostate cancer were suppressed during treatment with buserelin from 332 ng/dL to 215 ng/dL (28.9% lower than controls) with 200 μg by nasal spray twice a day (400 μg/day total), from 840 ng/dL to 182 ng/dL (71.4% lower than controls) with 500 μg by nasal spray twice a day (1,000 μg/day total), and from 598 ng/dL to 126 ng/dL (80.4% lower than controls) with 50 μg by subcutaneous injection once a day.

=== Pharmacokinetics ===
Buserelin is ineffective via oral administration due to first-pass metabolism in the gastrointestinal tract. Its bioavailability is 2.5 to 3.3% by intranasal administration and 70% by subcutaneous injection. The plasma protein binding of buserelin is approximately 15%. The metabolism of buserelin occurs in the liver, kidneys, and gastrointestinal tract and is mediated by peptidases, specifically pyroglutamyl peptidase and chymotrypsin-like endopeptidase. The elimination half-life of buserelin regardless of route of administration is about 72 to 80 minutes. Buserelin and its metabolites are eliminated in urine and bile, with approximately 50% of buserelin excreted in urine unchanged.

== Chemistry ==
Buserelin is a GnRH analogue, or a synthetic analogue of GnRH. It is a nonapeptide and is also known as [D-Ser(tBu)^{6},des-Gly-NH_{2}^{10}]GnRH ethylamide or as D-Ser(tBu)^{6}EA^{10}-GnRH. Buserelin is marketed for medical use in both its free base (buserelin) and acetate salt (buserelin acetate) forms.

== History ==
Buserelin was first described in 1976 and was introduced for medical use in 1984. Intranasal buserelin was the first GnRH agonist demonstrated to achieve medical castration in humans. This was initially observed via a marked decrease in circulating testosterone levels in a single patient in 1980.

== Society and culture ==
=== Generic names ===
Buserelin is the generic name of the drug and its INN and BAN, while buserelin acetate is its USAN, BANM, and JAN, buséréline is its DCF, and buserelina is its DCIT. While under development by Hoechst AG, buserelin was also known as HOE-766.

=== Brand names ===
Buserelin is marketed by Sanofi-Aventis primarily under the brand names Suprefact, Suprefact Depot, and Suprecur. It is also available under a number of other brand names including Bigonist, Bucel, Buserecur, Fuset, Metrelef, Profact, Profact Depot, Supremon, and Zerelin. CinnaFact is a generic version of the medication that is produced by CinnaGen. Buserelin is marketed for use in veterinary medicine primarily under the brand name Receptal, but is also available under the brand names Buserol, Busol, Porceptal, and Veterelin.

=== Availability ===
Buserelin is marketed in the United Kingdom, Ireland, other European countries, Canada, New Zealand, and South Africa, as well as in Latin America, Asia, and elsewhere in the world. It is not available in the United States or Australia.

== Research ==
The steroidal antiandrogen cyproterone acetate has been studied for blocking the testosterone flare at the start of buserelin therapy in men with prostate cancer. While cyproterone acetate for two weeks eliminates the biological and biochemical signs of the flare, no benefits on prostate cancer outcomes were observed.

Very low doses of buserelin nasal spray have been assessed for increasing testosterone levels and fertility in men with oligoasthenozoospermia and hypogonadotropic hypogonadism.

== See also ==
- Gonadotropin-releasing hormone receptor § Agonists
