= ATC code H01 =

ATC code H01 Pituitary and hypothalamic hormones and analogues is a therapeutic subgroup of the Anatomical Therapeutic Chemical Classification System, a system of alphanumeric codes developed by the World Health Organization (WHO) for the classification of drugs and other medical products. Subgroup H01 is part of the anatomical group H Systemic hormonal preparations, excluding sex hormones and insulins.

Codes for veterinary use (ATCvet codes) can be created by placing the letter Q in front of the human ATC code: for example, QH01. ATCvet codes without corresponding human ATC codes are cited with the leading Q in the following list.
National versions of the ATC classification may include additional codes not present in this list, which follows the WHO version.

== H01A Anterior pituitary lobe hormones and analogues ==
=== H01AA Adrenocorticotropic hormone ===
H01AA01 Corticotropin
H01AA02 Tetracosactide

=== H01AB Thyrotropin ===
H01AB01 Thyrotropin alfa

=== H01AC Somatropin and somatropin agonists ===
H01AC01 Somatropin
H01AC02 Somatrem
H01AC03 Mecasermin
H01AC04 Sermorelin
H01AC05 Mecasermin rinfabate
H01AC06 Tesamorelin
H01AC07 Somapacitan
H01AC08 Somatrogon
H01AC09 Lonapegsomatropin

=== H01AX Other anterior pituitary lobe hormones and analogues ===
H01AX01 Pegvisomant
QH01AX90 Capromorelin

== H01B Posterior pituitary lobe hormones ==
=== H01BA Vasopressin and analogues ===
H01BA01 Vasopressin (argipressin)
H01BA02 Desmopressin
H01BA03 Lypressin
H01BA04 Terlipressin
H01BA05 Ornipressin

=== H01BB Oxytocin and analogues ===
H01BB01 Demoxytocin
H01BB02 Oxytocin
H01BB03 Carbetocin

== H01C Hypothalamic hormones ==
=== H01CA Gonadotropin-releasing hormones ===
H01CA01 Gonadorelin
H01CA02 Nafarelin
QH01CA90 Buserelin
QH01CA91 Fertirelin
QH01CA92 Lecirelin
QH01CA93 Deslorelin
QH01CA94 Azagly-nafarelin
QH01CA95 Peforelin
QH01CA96 Salmon gonadotropin releasing hormone analogue
QH01CA97 Triptorelin
QH01CA98 Alarelin

=== H01CB Somatostatin and analogues ===
H01CB01 Somatostatin
H01CB02 Octreotide
H01CB03 Lanreotide
H01CB04 Vapreotide
H01CB05 Pasireotide
H01CB06 Paltusotine

=== H01CC Anti-gonadotropin-releasing hormones ===
H01CC01 Ganirelix
H01CC02 Cetrorelix
H01CC03 Elagolix
H01CC04 Linzagolix
H01CC53 Elagolix, estradiol and norethisterone
H01CC54 Relugolix, estradiol and norethisterone
