= C59H84N16O12 =

The molecular formula C_{59}H_{84}N_{16}O_{12} (molar mass: 1209.40 g/mol, exact mass: 1208.6455 u) may refer to:

- Lecirelin
- Leuprorelin, or leuprolide
