= Diclofenac etalhyaluronate =

Anti-inflammatory drug

Clinical data
- Trade names: Joycle
- Other names: Diclofenac etalhyaluronate sodium (JAN); SI-613

Legal status
- Legal status: Rx-only in Japan

Identifiers
- PubChem SID: 348350492
- UNII: M88B0M598L
- KEGG: D11020

Diclofenac etalhyaluronate (INN, USAN; trade name Joycle) is an anti-inflammatory and joint function improving drug. In Japan it is approved for use in the treatment of knee osteoarthritis.

Chemically, diclofenac etalhyaluronate consists of the drug diclofenac, a nonsteroidal antiinflammatory drug, covalently linked to hyaluronic acid. In the body, diclofenac is slowly cleaved and released, allowing diclofenac etalhyaluronate to function as a sustained-release form of diclofenac.
