= Leuprorelin/norethisterone acetate =

Combination medication

Combination of
- Leuprorelin: Gonadotropin-releasing hormone agonist
- Norethisterone acetate: Progestin

Clinical data
- Trade names: Lupaneta Pack
- Other names: Leuprolide/norethindrone acetate
- AHFS/Drugs.com: Micromedex Detailed Consumer Information
- License data: US DailyMed: Leuprolide and norethindrone
- Routes of administration: Intramuscular and by mouth
- ATC code: None

Legal status
- Legal status: US: ℞-only

Leuprorelin/norethisterone acetate, also known as leuprolide/norethindrone acetate and sold under the brand name Lupaneta Pack, is a co-packaged medication used to treat endometriosis. It contains leuprorelin as the acetate, a gonadotropin-releasing hormone agonist, and norethisterone acetate, a progestin. The leuprorelin is given by intramuscular injection and the norethisterone acetate is taken by mouth.

The co-packaged medication was approved for medical use in the United States in December 2012.

== Medical uses ==
Leuprorelin/norethisterone acetate is indicated for the initial management of the painful symptoms of endometriosis and for management of recurrence of symptoms.
