= Azagly-nafarelin =

Chemical compound

Clinical data
- Trade names: Gonazon
- Other names: 6-[3-(2-Naphthalenyl)-D-alanine]-1-9-luteinizing hormone-releasing factor (swine) 2-(aminocarbonyl)hydrazide; 6-[3-(2-Naphthalenyl)-D-alanine]-10-deglycinamide-luteinizing hormone-releasing factor (pig) 2-(aminocarbonyl)hydrazide
- Routes of administration: Implant; Injection
- Drug class: GnRH agonist

Identifiers
- IUPAC name: (S)-N-((6S,9S,12R,15S,18S,21S,24S)-21-((1H-indol-3-yl)methyl)-1,1-diamino-6-((S)-2-(2-carbamoylhydrazine-1-carbonyl)pyrrolidine-1-carbonyl)-15-(4-hydroxybenzyl)-18-(hydroxymethyl)-25-(1H-imidazol-5-yl)-9-isobutyl-12-(naphthalen-2-ylmethyl)-8,11,14,17,20,23-hexaoxo-2,7,10,13,16,19,22-heptaazapentacos-1-en-24-yl)-5-oxopyrrolidine-2-carboxamide
- CAS Number: 91991-07-0 113962-45-1 (acetate)
- PubChem CID: 25078401
- ChemSpider: 17295617
- UNII: 2N7D33X56N
- CompTox Dashboard (EPA): DTXSID30873507

Chemical and physical data
- Formula: C_{65}H_{82}N_{18}O_{13}
- Molar mass: 1323.484 g·mol^{−1}
- 3D model (JSmol): Interactive image
- SMILES: CC(C[C@H](NC([C@H](NC([C@@H](NC([C@@H](NC([C@@H](NC([C@@H](NC([C@@H]1CCC(N1)=O)=O)CC2=CN=CN2)=O)CC3=CNC4=CC=CC=C43)=O)CO)=O)CC5=CC=C(O)C=C5)=O)CC6=CC7=CC=CC=C7C=C6)=O)C(N[C@H](C(N8CCC[C@H]8C(NNC(N)=O)=O)=O)CCC/N=C(N)\N)=O)C
- InChI: InChI=1S/C65H82N18O13/c1-35(2)25-47(56(88)74-46(13-7-23-70-64(66)67)63(95)83-24-8-14-53(83)62(94)81-82-65(68)96)75-58(90)49(28-37-15-18-38-9-3-4-10-39(38)26-37)76-57(89)48(27-36-16-19-42(85)20-17-36)77-61(93)52(33-84)80-59(91)50(29-40-31-71-44-12-6-5-11-43(40)44)78-60(92)51(30-41-32-69-34-72-41)79-55(87)45-21-22-54(86)73-45/h3-6,9-12,15-20,26,31-32,34-35,45-53,71,84-85H,7-8,13-14,21-25,27-30,33H2,1-2H3,(H,69,72)(H,73,86)(H,74,88)(H,75,90)(H,76,89)(H,77,93)(H,78,92)(H,79,87)(H,80,91)(H,81,94)(H4,66,67,70)(H3,68,82,96)/t45-,46-,47-,48-,49+,50-,51-,52-,53-/m0/s1; Key:FDOMSRGNWHJMGI-XRSSZCMZSA-N

Azagly-nafarelin, sold under the brand name Gonazon, is a gonadotropin-releasing hormone agonist (GnRH agonist) medication which is used in veterinary medicine in Europe. It is a GnRH analogue and a synthetic peptide, specifically a decapeptide. The medication has been approved in Europe as a solid silicone-based matrix implant for use as a contraceptive in animals such as male dogs, cats, and others, but is no longer or was never commercially available. The medication has also been used to treat benign prostatic hyperplasia in animals. In addition to its use in mammals, azagly-nafarelin has been approved for use in aquaculture fish, specifically to control ovulation in salmonids, and was the first GnRH agonist to be available for use in fish. It was introduced for use by 2005.

== See also ==
- Gonadotropin-releasing hormone receptor § Agonists
