= Vapreotide =

Pharmaceutical drug

Clinical data
- Trade names: Sanvar
- Other names: H-D-Phe-Cys(1)-Tyr-D-Trp-Lys-Val-Cys(1)-Trp-NH2; Octastatin
- ATC code: H01CB04 (WHO)

Pharmacokinetic data
- Elimination half-life: 30 minutes

Identifiers
- IUPAC name: D-phenylalanyl-L-cysteinyl-L-tyrosyl-D-tryptophyl-L-lysyl-L-valyl-L-cysteinyl-L-tryptophanamide (2->7)-disulfide
- CAS Number: 103222-11-3
- PubChem CID: 23725064
- PubChem SID: 46506923
- DrugBank: DB04894
- ChemSpider: 64425
- UNII: 2PK59M9GFF
- KEGG: D06281
- CompTox Dashboard (EPA): DTXSID00883113

Chemical and physical data
- Formula: C_{57}H_{70}N_{12}O_{9}S_{2}
- Molar mass: 1131.38 g·mol^{−1}
- 3D model (JSmol): Interactive image
- Density: 1.4 g/cm^{3}
- Boiling point: 1,540.9 °C (2,805.6 °F)
- SMILES: CC(C)[C@H]1C(=O)N[C@@H](CSSC[C@@H](C(=O)N[C@H](C(=O)N[C@@H](C(=O)N[C@H](C(=O)N1)CCCCN)Cc2c[nH]c3c2cccc3)Cc4ccc(cc4)O)NC(=O)[C@@H](Cc5ccccc5)N)C(=O)N[C@@H](Cc6c[nH]c7c6cccc7)C(=O)N
- InChI: InChI=1S/C57H70N12O9S2/c1-32(2)49-57(78)68-48(55(76)64-44(50(60)71)26-35-28-61-41-16-8-6-14-38(35)41)31-80-79-30-47(67-51(72)40(59)24-33-12-4-3-5-13-33)56(77)65-45(25-34-19-21-37(70)22-20-34)53(74)66-46(27-36-29-62-42-17-9-7-15-39(36)42)54(75)63-43(52(73)69-49)18-10-11-23-58/h3-9,12-17,19-22,28-29,32,40,43-49,61-62,70H,10-11,18,23-27,30-31,58-59H2,1-2H3,(H2,60,71)(H,63,75)(H,64,76)(H,65,77)(H,66,74)(H,67,72)(H,68,78)(H,69,73)/t40-,43+,44+,45+,46-,47+,48+,49+/m1/s1; Key:SWXOGPJRIDTIRL-DOUNNPEJSA-N

Vapreotide (Sanvar) is a synthetic somatostatin analog. It is used in the treatment of esophageal variceal bleeding in patients with cirrhotic liver disease and AIDS-related diarrhea.

It is an 8 residue peptide with sequence H-D-Phe-Cys(1)-Tyr-D-Trp-Lys-Val-Cys(1)-Trp-NH2.
