= Fertirelin =

Chemical compound

Clinical data
- Trade names: Ovalyse
- Other names: TAP-031; U-69689; 9-(N-Ethyl-L-prolinamide)-10-deglycinamide; 9-(N)-Et-ProNH2-10-des-GlyNH2-LHRH; Pyr-His-Trp-Ser-Tyr-Gly-Leu-Arg-Pro-NHEt
- Drug class: GnRH analogue; GnRH agonist; Antigonadotropin
- ATCvet code: QH01CA91 (WHO)

Identifiers
- IUPAC name: (2S)-N-[(2S)-1-[[(2S)-1-[[(2S)-1-[[(2S)-1-[[2-[[(2S)-1-[[(2S)-5-(diaminomethylideneamino)-1-[(2S)-2-(ethylcarbamoyl)pyrrolidin-1-yl]-1-oxopentan-2-yl]amino]-4-methyl-1-oxopentan-2-yl]amino]-2-oxoethyl]amino]-3-(4-hydroxyphenyl)-1-oxopropan-2-yl]amino]-3-hydroxy-1-oxopropan-2-yl]amino]-3-(1H-indol-3-yl)-1-oxopropan-2-yl]amino]-3-(1H-imidazol-5-yl)-1-oxopropan-2-yl]-5-oxopyrrolidine-2-carboxamide
- CAS Number: 38234-21-8; acetate: 66002-66-2
- PubChem CID: 188304
- ChemSpider: 163670
- UNII: Q041AO6T91; acetate: JD54DU77I8
- KEGG: D07957
- ChEMBL: ChEMBL3272563
- CompTox Dashboard (EPA): DTXSID8057728
- ECHA InfoCard: 100.164.570

Chemical and physical data
- Formula: C_{55}H_{76}N_{16}O_{12}
- Molar mass: 1153.313 g·mol^{−1}
- 3D model (JSmol): Interactive image
- SMILES: CCNC(=O)[C@@H]1CCCN1C(=O)[C@H](CCCN=C(N)N)NC(=O)[C@H](CC(C)C)NC(=O)CNC(=O)[C@H](Cc1ccc(O)cc1)NC(=O)[C@H](CO)NC(=O)[C@H](Cc1c[nH]c2ccccc12)NC(=O)[C@H](Cc1cnc[nH]1)NC(=O)[C@@H]1CCC(=O)N1
- InChI: InChI=1S/C55H76N16O12/c1-4-59-53(82)44-12-8-20-71(44)54(83)38(11-7-19-60-55(56)57)66-49(78)39(21-30(2)3)65-46(75)27-62-47(76)40(22-31-13-15-34(73)16-14-31)67-52(81)43(28-72)70-50(79)41(23-32-25-61-36-10-6-5-9-35(32)36)68-51(80)42(24-33-26-58-29-63-33)69-48(77)37-17-18-45(74)64-37/h5-6,9-10,13-16,25-26,29-30,37-44,61,72-73H,4,7-8,11-12,17-24,27-28H2,1-3H3,(H,58,63)(H,59,82)(H,62,76)(H,64,74)(H,65,75)(H,66,78)(H,67,81)(H,68,80)(H,69,77)(H,70,79)(H4,56,57,60)/t37-,38-,39-,40-,41-,42-,43-,44-/m0/s1; Key:DGCPIBPDYFLAAX-YTAGXALCSA-N

Fertirelin, or fertirelin acetate, sold under the brand name Ovalyse, is a gonadotropin-releasing hormone agonist (GnRH agonist) which has been marketed in the United Kingdom and Austria. It may no longer be available. Fertirelin has been used in veterinary medicine. It may have been used in the treatment of sex hormone-dependent conditions and infertility in women. The drug was first introduced in 1981 in Japan to treat various kinds of ovarian failure in cattle. Fertirelin is a synthetic peptide and GnRH analogue. It is used as the acetate salt.

== See also ==
- Gonadotropin-releasing hormone receptor § Agonists
