= Deslorelin =

Chemical compound

Clinical data
- Trade names: Suprelorin, others
- AHFS/Drugs.com: International Drug Names
- Routes of administration: Implant
- Drug class: GnRH analogue; GnRH agonist; Antigonadotropin
- ATCvet code: QH01CA93 (WHO)

Legal status
- Legal status: EU: Rx-only

Pharmacokinetic data
- Excretion: Kidney

Identifiers
- IUPAC name: (2S)-N-[(2S)-1-[[(2S)-1-[[(2S)-1-[[(2S)-1-[[(2R)-1-[[(2S)-1-[[(2S)-5-(diaminomethylideneamino)-1-[(2S)-2-(ethylcarbamoyl)pyrrolidin-1-yl]-1-oxopentan-2-yl]amino]-4-methyl-1-oxopentan-2-yl]amino]-3-(1H-indol-3-yl)-1-oxopropan-2-yl]amino]-3-(4-hydroxyphenyl)-1-oxopropan-2-yl]amino]-3-hydroxy-1-oxopropan-2-yl]amino]-3-(1H-indol-3-yl)-1-oxopropan-2-yl]amino]-3-(1H-imidazol-5-yl)-1-oxopropan-2-yl]-5-oxopyrrolidine-2-carboxamide
- CAS Number: 57773-65-6
- PubChem CID: 16133804
- ChemSpider: 16736553
- UNII: TKG3I66TVE
- ChEMBL: ChEMBL2365665
- CompTox Dashboard (EPA): DTXSID2048323
- ECHA InfoCard: 100.165.050

Chemical and physical data
- Formula: C_{64}H_{83}N_{17}O_{12}
- Molar mass: 1282.475 g·mol^{−1}
- 3D model (JSmol): Interactive image
- SMILES: CCNC(=O)[C@@H]1CCCN1C(=O)[C@H](CCCNC(=N)N)NC(=O)[C@H](CC(C)C)NC(=O)[C@@H](Cc2c[nH]c3c2cccc3)NC(=O)[C@H](Cc4ccc(cc4)O)NC(=O)[C@H](CO)NC(=O)[C@H](Cc5c[nH]c6c5cccc6)NC(=O)[C@H](Cc7cnc[nH]7)NC(=O)[C@@H]8CCC(=O)N8
- InChI: InChI=1S/C64H83N17O12/c1-4-68-62(92)53-16-10-24-81(53)63(93)46(15-9-23-69-64(65)66)74-56(86)47(25-35(2)3)75-58(88)49(27-37-30-70-43-13-7-5-11-41(37)43)77-57(87)48(26-36-17-19-40(83)20-18-36)76-61(91)52(33-82)80-59(89)50(28-38-31-71-44-14-8-6-12-42(38)44)78-60(90)51(29-39-32-67-34-72-39)79-55(85)45-21-22-54(84)73-45/h5-8,11-14,17-20,30-32,34-35,45-53,70-71,82-83H,4,9-10,15-16,21-29,33H2,1-3H3,(H,67,72)(H,68,92)(H,73,84)(H,74,86)(H,75,88)(H,76,91)(H,77,87)(H,78,90)(H,79,85)(H,80,89)(H4,65,66,69)/t45-,46-,47-,48-,49+,50-,51-,52-,53-/m0/s1; Key:GJKXGJCSJWBJEZ-XRSSZCMZSA-N

Deslorelin, sold under the brand name Suprelorin among others, is an injectable gonadotropin releasing hormone superagonist (GnRH agonist) which is used in veterinary medicine for various indications.

== Uses ==
=== Veterinary ===
Deslorelin is used in veterinary medicine. One commercial form of deslorelin acetate is marketed by Peptech with the brand name Ovuplant. Another form is available in the United States, Sucromate Equine, which was FDA-approved for use in horses in November 2010. This is manufactured by Thorne BioScience LLC and was introduced to the United States market following the withdrawal of Ovuplant. The deslorelin products are currently approved for use in veterinary medicine and to promote ovulation in mares as part of the artificial insemination process. It is also used to stabilize high-risk pregnancies, mainly of livestock. Unlike other GnRH agonists, which are mainly used to inhibit luteinizing hormone and follicle-stimulating hormone by their ultimate downregulation of the pituitary gland, Deslorelin is primarily used for the initial flare effect upon the pituitary, and its associated surge of LH secretion. Suprelorin is a slowly releasing deslorelin implant used for chemical castration of dogs and ferrets. It is marketed by Virbac. Deslorelin is also used to treat benign prostate hyperplasia in dogs. It is also used to treat pet parrots suffering from chronic egg laying behavior.

== Pharmacology ==
=== Pharmacokinetics ===
Bioavailability is almost complete.

== Chemistry ==
Deslorelin is a synthetic analogue of naturally occurring gonadotropin-releasing hormone (GnRH).

== History ==
Deslorelin was successfully trialed in the U.S. and was approved for veterinary use under certain circumstances. In Europe, it was approved for use in equine assisted reproduction.

Ovuplant was withdrawn from the U.S. market following issues with mares which did not become pregnant failing to return to estrus in a timely manner. Techniques were developed where the implant was removed 48 hours after implantation in the mare, however compounded biorelease Deslorelin products were at the time available as well as more commonly used ovulation promoters such as hCG, which did not produce the same failure effect. Upon "Sucromate Equine" receiving FDA-approval, the compounded products were no longer legally available within the U.S., however they remain available in Australia and New Zealand where an approved version is marketed.

It is also being trialed in humans to study its efficacy in treatment of breast cancer in women, and in treating precocious puberty and congenital adrenal hyperplasia in male and female children.

As of August 2011 this drug was not approved for general use outside the FDA-licensed functions in the U.S., other than within approved clinical trials. Orphan drug status has been designated in the U.S., though approval had not been issued as of 2011.

== Research ==
Deslorelin was under development for the treatment of endometriosis, polyendocrine metabolic ovarian syndrome (PMOS), precocious puberty, prostate cancer, and uterine fibroids in humans and reached phase III clinical trials for prostate cancer but development was discontinued for all of these indications by 2001.
