= Gonadotropin-releasing hormone modulator =

Type of medication which modulates the GnRH receptor

- Drug class
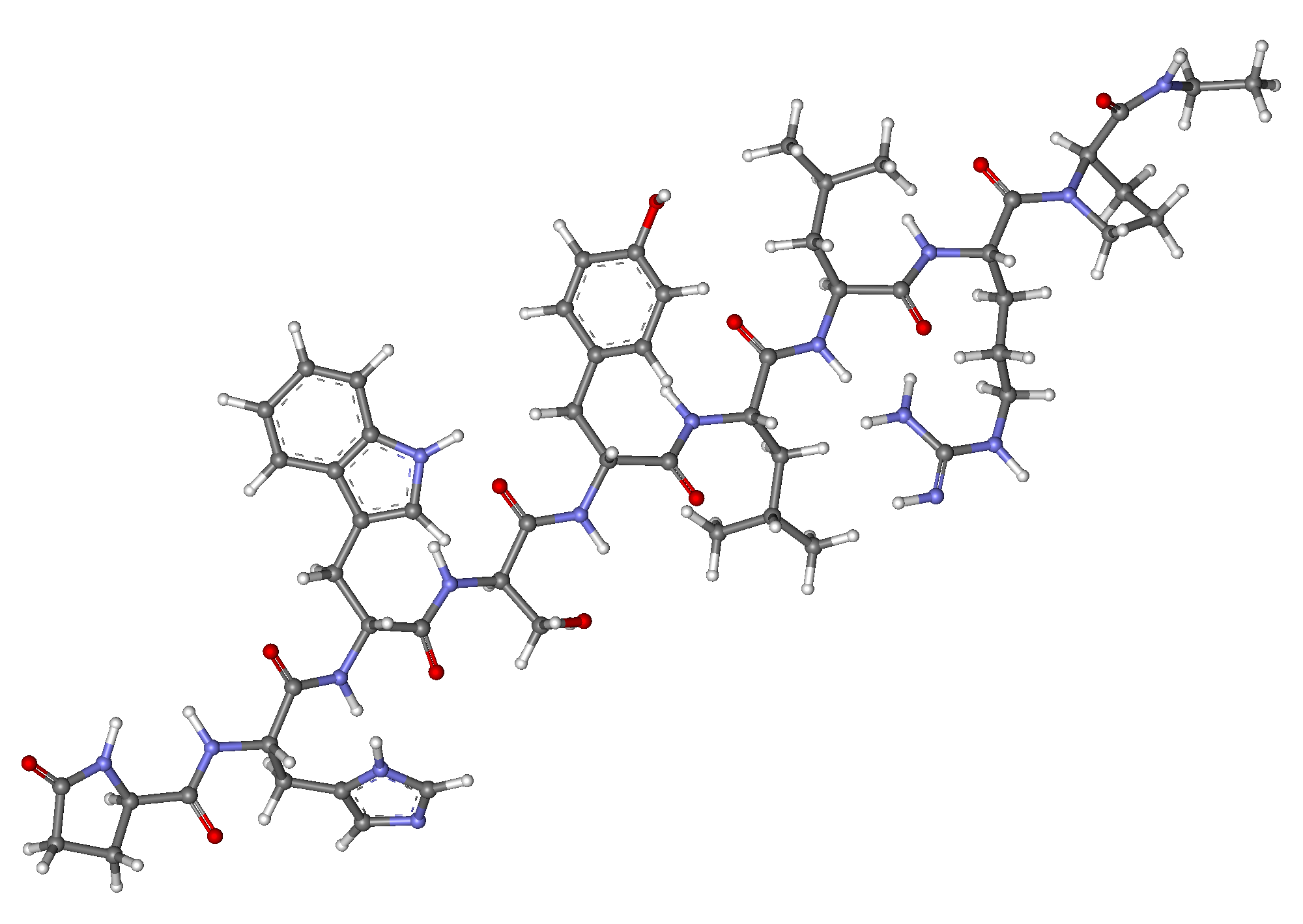
- Leuprorelin, a GnRH agonist and GnRH analogue and a prototypical GnRH modulator.

Class identifiers
- Synonyms: GnRH receptor modulator; GnRH analogue; GnRH agonist; GnRH antagonist; GnRH blocker; LHRH modulator; LHRH receptor modulator; LHRH analogue; LHRH agonist; LHRH antagonist; LHRH blocker
- Use: Infertility; prostate cancer; precocious puberty; breast cancer; endometriosis; uterine fibroids; transgender people
- Biological target: GnRH receptor
- Chemical class: Peptide; small-molecule (non-peptide)

Legal status

A GnRH modulator, or GnRH receptor modulator, also known as an LHRH modulator or LHRH receptor modulator, is a type of medication which modulates the GnRH receptor, the biological target of the hypothalamic hormone gonadotropin-releasing hormone (GnRH; also known as luteinizing-releasing hormone, or LHRH). They include GnRH agonists and GnRH antagonists. These medications may be GnRH analogues like leuprorelin and cetrorelix – peptides that are structurally related to GnRH – or small-molecules like elagolix and relugolix, which are structurally distinct from and unrelated to GnRH analogues.

GnRH modulators affect the secretion of the gonadotropins, luteinizing hormone (LH) and follicle-stimulating hormone (FSH), which in turn affects the gonads, influencing their function and hence fertility as well as the production of sex steroids, including that of estradiol and progesterone in women and of testosterone in men. As such, GnRH modulators can also be described as progonadotropic or antigonadotropic, depending on whether they act to increase or decrease gonadotropins.

Shortly after the discovery of GnRH by Nobel laureates Guillemin and Schally, researchers tried to modify the GnRH decapeptide with the intent to create analogues that could activate or block the receptor. Subsequent to the development and introduction of GnRH analogues, non-peptide or small-molecule GnRH modulators were developed and introduced.

All GnRH modulators are contraindicated in pregnancy (pregnancy category X).

== GnRH agonists ==
A gonadotropin-releasing hormone agonist (GnRH agonist) is a GnRH modulator that activates the GnRH receptor resulting in increased secretion of FSH and LH. Initially it was thought that GnRH agonists could be used as potent and prolonged stimulators of pituitary gonadotropin release, but it was soon recognized that GnRH agonists, after their initial stimulating action – termed a "flare" effect – eventually caused a paradoxical and sustained drop in gonadotropin secretion. This second effect was termed "downregulation" and can be observed after about 10 days. While this phase is reversible upon stopping the medication, it can be maintained when GnRH agonists use is continued for a long time. GnRH agonists can also be administered in a pulsatile manner through the use of a pump to produce a long-term stimulation of gonadotropin secretion, for instance to induce puberty.

=== Peptides (analogues) ===
- Buserelin
- Deslorelin
- Fertirelin
- Gonadorelin
- Goserelin
- Histrelin
- Lecirelin
- Leuprorelin
- Nafarelin
- Peforelin
- Triptorelin

== GnRH antagonists ==
A gonadotropin-releasing hormone antagonist (GnRH antagonist) is a GnRH modulator that blocks the GnRH receptor resulting in an immediate drop in gonadotropin (FSH, LH) secretion. GnRH antagonists are primarily used in IVF treatments to block natural ovulation.

=== Peptides (analogues) ===
- Abarelix
- Cetrorelix
- Degarelix
- Ganirelix

=== Non-peptides (small-molecules) ===
- Elagolix
- Linzagolix^{a}
- Relugolix

^{a} = Under development; not yet marketed.

== See also ==
- Steroidogenesis inhibitor
- List of investigational sex-hormonal agents § GnRH/gonadotropins
