= GNRHR2 =

Protein-coding gene in humans

Identifiers
- Aliases: GNRHR2, GnRH-II-R, gonadotropin releasing hormone receptor 2 (pseudogene)
- External IDs: GeneCards: GNRHR2

Gene location (Human)
Chr.	Chromosome 1 (human)
Band	1q21.1	Start	145,919,013 bp
Band	1q21.1	End	145,925,341 bp
Orthologs
Databases	NCBI: entry; OMA: entry
Species	Human	Mouse
Entrez	114814	n/a
Ensembl	ENSG00000211451	n/a
UniProt	n a	n/a
RefSeq (mRNA)	NM_057163; NM_206994	n/a
RefSeq (protein)	n/a	n/a
Location (UCSC)	Chr 1: 145.92 – 145.93 Mb	n/a
PubMed search		n/a
- Wikidata
View/Edit Human

Putative gonadotropin-releasing hormone II receptor is a protein that in humans is encoded by the GNRHR2 gene.

== Function ==
The receptor for gonadotropin-releasing hormone 2 (GnRH2) is encoded by the GnRH2 receptor (GnRHR2) gene. In non-hominoid primates and non-mammalian vertebrates, GnRHR2 encodes a seven-transmembrane G protein-coupled receptor. However, in humans, the N-terminus of the predicted protein contains a frameshift and premature stop codon. In humans, GnRHR2 transcription occurs but whether the gene produces a functional C-terminal multi-transmembrane protein is currently unresolved. Alternative splice variants have been reported. An untranscribed pseudogene of GnRHR2 is also on chromosome 14.

== See also ==
- Gonadotropin-releasing hormone receptor
