= Triptorelin =

GnRH-agonist

Clinical data
- Trade names: Decapeptyl, others
- AHFS/Drugs.com: Micromedex Detailed Consumer Information
- License data: US DailyMed: Triptorelin
- Routes of administration: Intramuscular
- Drug class: GnRH analogue; GnRH agonist; Antigonadotropin
- ATC code: L02AE04 (WHO) QH01CA97 (WHO)

Legal status
- Legal status: AU: S4 (Prescription only); CA: ℞-only; US: ℞-only; In general: ℞ (Prescription only)

Pharmacokinetic data
- Elimination half-life: The elimination half-life for patients with hepatic impairment was similar to that of patients with renal impairment (geometric mean t(1/2, z): 6.6 h, 7.7 h and 7.6 h for Groups II, III and IV, respectively), but significantly longer than in healthy volunteers (2.8 h for Group I) Triptorelin is a gonadotropin-releasing hormone (GnRH) analogue with enhanced affinity for GnRH receptors and a prolonged half-life due to its resistance to enzymatic degradation.
- Excretion: Kidney

Identifiers
- IUPAC name: 5-oxo-D-prolyl-L-histidyl-Ltryptophyl-L-seryl-Ltyrosyl-3-(1H-indol-2-yl)-L-alanylleucyl-L-arginyl-L-prolylglycinamide
- CAS Number: 57773-63-4
- PubChem CID: 25074470
- IUPHAR/BPS: 1177
- DrugBank: DB06825
- ChemSpider: 17290424
- UNII: 9081Y98W2V
- KEGG: D06247; D08649
- ChEBI: CHEBI:63633
- ChEMBL: ChEMBL1201334
- CompTox Dashboard (EPA): DTXSID2048375
- ECHA InfoCard: 100.165.044

Chemical and physical data
- Formula: C_{64}H_{82}N_{18}O_{13}
- Molar mass: 1311.473 g·mol^{−1}
- 3D model (JSmol): Interactive image
- SMILES: CC(C)C[C@@H](C(=O)N[C@@H](CCCNC(=N)N)C(=O)N1CCC[C@H]1C(=O)NCC(=O)N)NC(=O)[C@@H](Cc2c[nH]c3c2cccc3)NC(=O)[C@H](Cc4ccc(cc4)O)NC(=O)[C@H](CO)NC(=O)[C@H](Cc5c[nH]c6c5cccc6)NC(=O)[C@H](Cc7cnc[nH]7)NC(=O)[C@@H]8CCC(=O)N8
- InChI: InChI=1S/C64H82N18O13/c1-34(2)23-46(56(88)75-45(13-7-21-69-64(66)67)63(95)82-22-8-14-52(82)62(94)72-31-53(65)85)76-58(90)48(25-36-28-70-42-11-5-3-9-40(36)42)78-57(89)47(24-35-15-17-39(84)18-16-35)77-61(93)51(32-83)81-59(91)49(26-37-29-71-43-12-6-4-10-41(37)43)79-60(92)50(27-38-30-68-33-73-38)80-55(87)44-19-20-54(86)74-44/h3-6,9-12,15-18,28-30,33-34,44-52,70-71,83-84H,7-8,13-14,19-27,31-32H2,1-2H3,(H2,65,85)(H,68,73)(H,72,94)(H,74,86)(H,75,88)(H,76,90)(H,77,93)(H,78,89)(H,79,92)(H,80,87)(H,81,91)(H4,66,67,69)/t44-,45-,46-,47-,48+,49-,50-,51-,52-/m0/s1; Key:VXKHXGOKWPXYNA-PGBVPBMZSA-N

Triptorelin, sold under the brand name Decapeptyl among others, is a medication that acts as an agonist analog of gonadotropin-releasing hormone, repressing expression of luteinizing hormone (LH) and follicle-stimulating hormone (FSH). It was patented in 1975 and approved for medical use in 1986. Triptorelin is a therapeutic alternative on the World Health Organization's List of Essential Medicines.

It is a decapeptide (pGlu-His-Trp-Ser-Tyr-D-Trp-Leu-Arg-Pro-Gly-NH_{2}) and a gonadotropin-releasing hormone agonist (GnRH agonist) used as the acetate or pamoate salts.

Primary indications include endometriosis, for the reduction of uterine fibroids, to treat prostate cancer, to treat male hypersexuality with severe sexual deviation, and to delay puberty in cases of precocious puberty or gender dysphoria.

== Medical uses ==
Triptorelin is used to treat prostate cancer as part of androgen deprivation therapy.

Another common use in the United Kingdom is for hormone replacement therapy to suppress testosterone or estrogen levels in transgender people (in conjunction with estradiol valerate for trans women or testosterone for trans men). Spironolactone and cyproterone acetate are other drugs used by trans people to suppress sex hormones, but these drugs have a completely different mechanism of action. It can also be used as a puberty blocker in the case of precocious puberty.

Triptorelin has been used as a chemical castration agent for reducing sexual urges in sex offenders.

== Drug action ==
Triptorelin is a gonadorelin analogue, also known as luteinizing hormone releasing analogue (GnRH analogue, LHRH analogue). The drug binds to receptors in the pituitary gland and stimulates secretion of gonadotropins (namely luteinizing hormone LH and follicle-stimulating hormone FSH). This causes an initial phase of LH and FSH stimulation, prior to down-regulation of the gonadotrophin-releasing hormone receptors, thereby reducing the release of gonadotropins in the long term, which in turn leads to the inhibition of androgen and estrogen production.

== Side-effects ==
General side effects can include:

- Anaphylaxis
- Arthralgia
- Asthenia
- Asthma
- Breast tenderness (males and females)
- Changes in blood pressure
- Changes in breast size
- Depression
- Ovarian cysts
- Mood changes
- Skin rashes
- Hot flushes
- Weight changes

== Society and culture ==
=== Brand names ===
Triptorelin is marketed under the brand names Decapeptyl (Ipsen) for treating prostate cancer, endometriosis, uterine myomas, and precocious puberty, and Diphereline and Gonapeptyl (Ferring Pharmaceuticals). In the United States, it is sold by Watson Pharmaceuticals as Trelstar and by Arbor Pharmaceuticals as Triptodur (an extended-release 6-month depot injection). In Iran, triptorelin is marketed under the brand name Variopeptyl. In the UK and Germany, it is sold as Salvacyl for the treatment of sexual deviations.

== History ==
Triptorelin was developed in Andrew V. Schally's lab at Tulane University. Debiopharm licensed the drug from Tulane in 1982.

== Research ==
Triptorelin and other antiandrogens may be effective in the treatment of obsessive–compulsive disorder.

=== Dosage in IVF treatment ===
Minimal daily dose of triptorelin acetate needed to suppress a premature LH surge during IVF treatment has been determined to be 15 microgram daily, and that 50 microg is equivalent to 100 microg in terms of IVF results.

GnRHa doses used in IVF are derived from treatment

schedules used in disseminated prostate cancer, which aim at

complete gonadal suppression under all circumstances. Some

comparative studies indicate that the daily dose of agonist

used in IVF may be decreased without compromising the

results

The interval between initiation of study medication and start of FSH stimulation was defined as the desensitization phase.

For both parameters, adjacent comparisons showed a statistically significant difference between the effect of placebo and 15 μgtriptorelin, but not between 15 and 50 μg, or between 50 and 100 μg (Table II).

moreover, it appeared that a daily dose of 50 μg triptorelincreates a state of pituitary desensitization comparable with the "standard" dose of 100 μg, and this endocrine finding was confirmed in the current study.

=== In prostate cancer ===
Modern assay technologies reveal that bilateral orchiectomy results in a serum T level of approximately 15 ng/dL as compared to the historical definition of castration of T < 50 ng/dL

== Pharmacokinetics ==
=== Gonapeptyl Depot 3.75 mg ===
The systemic bioavailability of the active component triptorelin from the intramuscular depot is 38.3% in the first 13 days (2.9% per day). Further release is linear at 0.92% of the dose per day on average (34μg). Bioavailability after S.C. application is 69% of I.M. availability.

Plasma triptorelin values decreased to approx. 100 pg/ml before the next application after I.M. or S.C. application (median values).
