= Australian Approved Name =

Generic drug name set by the TGA for use in Australia

An Australian Approved Name (AAN) is a generic drug name set by the Therapeutic Goods Administration (TGA) for use in Australia. In late 2016, the TGA changed several drug names to the corresponding international nonproprietary name (INN), or, in cases where an INN was not available (as with asparaginase), another established generic name, such as the United States Adopted Name (USAN).

== See also ==
- International Nonproprietary Name
- British Approved Name
- United States Adopted Name
- Japanese Accepted Name
