= Denominazione Comune Italiana =

The Denominazione Comune Italiana (DCIT), or "Common Italian Denomination/Name" in English, is the formal Italian generic name for a drug.

== See also ==
- International Nonproprietary Name (INN)
- Dénomination Commune Française (DCF)
- United States Adopted Name (USAN)
- British Approved Name (BAN)
- Australian Approved Name (AAN)
- Japanese Accepted Name (JAN)
