= Peforelin =

Chemical compound

Clinical data
- Trade names: Maprelin
- Other names: Lamprey GnRH-III; H-Pyr-His-Trp-Ser-His-Asp-Trp-Lys-Pro-Gly-NH_{2}; XHWSHDWKPG
- Routes of administration: Injection
- Drug class: GnRH agonist

Identifiers
- IUPAC name: (3S)-4-[[(2S)-1-[[(2S)-6-amino-1-[(2S)-2-[(2-amino-2-oxoethyl)carbamoyl]pyrrolidin-1-yl]-1-oxohexan-2-yl]amino]-3-(1H-indol-3-yl)-1-oxopropan-2-yl]amino]-3-[[(2S)-2-[[(2S)-3-hydroxy-2-[[(2S)-2-[[(2S)-3-(1H-imidazol-5-yl)-2-[[(2S)-5-oxopyrrolidine-2-carbonyl]amino]propanoyl]amino]-3-(1H-indol-3-yl)propanoyl]amino]propanoyl]amino]-3-(1H-imidazol-5-yl)propanoyl]amino]-4-oxobutanoic acid
- CAS Number: 147859-97-0
- PubChem CID: 16197823
- ChemSpider: 17326238
- UNII: UJ8NQ5Z0VX
- CompTox Dashboard (EPA): DTXSID30163819
- ECHA InfoCard: 100.223.356

Chemical and physical data
- Formula: C_{59}H_{74}N_{18}O_{14}
- Molar mass: 1259.353 g·mol^{−1}
- 3D model (JSmol): Interactive image
- SMILES: NCCCC[C@H](NC(=O)[C@H](Cc1c[nH]c2ccccc12)NC(=O)[C@H](CC(=O)O)NC(=O)[C@H](Cc1cnc[nH]1)NC(=O)[C@H](CO)NC(=O)[C@H](Cc1c[nH]c2ccccc12)NC(=O)[C@H](Cc1cnc[nH]1)NC(=O)[C@@H]1CCC(=O)N1)C(=O)N1CCC[C@H]1C(=O)NCC(N)=O
- InChI: InChI=1S/C59H74N18O14/c60-16-6-5-12-40(59(91)77-17-7-13-47(77)58(90)66-27-48(61)79)70-52(84)41(18-31-23-64-37-10-3-1-8-35(31)37)72-56(88)45(22-50(81)82)75-55(87)44(21-34-26-63-30-68-34)74-57(89)46(28-78)76-53(85)42(19-32-24-65-38-11-4-2-9-36(32)38)71-54(86)43(20-33-25-62-29-67-33)73-51(83)39-14-15-49(80)69-39/h1-4,8-11,23-26,29-30,39-47,64-65,78H,5-7,12-22,27-28,60H2,(H2,61,79)(H,62,67)(H,63,68)(H,66,90)(H,69,80)(H,70,84)(H,71,86)(H,72,88)(H,73,83)(H,74,89)(H,75,87)(H,76,85)(H,81,82)/t39-,40-,41-,42-,43-,44-,45-,46-,47-/m0/s1; Key:RTASYRSYWSLWJV-CSYZDTNESA-N

Peforelin (INN), or peforelin acetate, sold under the brand name Maprelin, is a gonadotropin-releasing hormone agonist (GnRH agonist) medication which is used in veterinary medicine in Europe and Canada. It is a GnRH analogue and a synthetic peptide, specifically a decapeptide. The drug was introduced for veterinary use by 2001.

== See also ==
- Gonadotropin-releasing hormone receptor § Agonists
