= Lecirelin =

Chemical compound

Clinical data
- Trade names: Dalmarelin, Ovucron, Reproreline
- Other names: H-Pyr-His-Trp-Ser-Tyr-D-Gly(tBu)-Leu-Arg-Pro-NHEt; XHWSYXLRP
- Routes of administration: Injection
- Drug class: GnRH agonist

Identifiers
- IUPAC name: (2S)-N-[(2S)-1-[[(2S)-1-[[(2S)-1-[[(2S)-1-[[(2R)-1-[[(2S)-1-[[(2S)-5-(diaminomethylideneamino)-1-[(2S)-2-(ethylcarbamoyl)pyrrolidin-1-yl]-1-oxopentan-2-yl]amino]-4-methyl-1-oxopentan-2-yl]amino]-3,3-dimethyl-1-oxobutan-2-yl]amino]-3-(4-hydroxyphenyl)-1-oxopropan-2-yl]amino]-3-hydroxy-1-oxopropan-2-yl]amino]-3-(1H-indol-3-yl)-1-oxopropan-2-yl]amino]-3-(1H-imidazol-5-yl)-1-oxopropan-2-yl]-5-oxopyrrolidine-2-carboxamide
- CAS Number: 61012-19-9
- PubChem CID: 66577115
- ChemSpider: 25027162
- UNII: ZD8NZ8J5LN
- CompTox Dashboard (EPA): DTXSID00735365
- ECHA InfoCard: 100.224.787

Chemical and physical data
- Formula: C_{59}H_{84}N_{16}O_{12}
- Molar mass: 1209.421 g·mol^{−1}
- 3D model (JSmol): Interactive image
- SMILES: CCNC(=O)[C@@H]1CCCN1C(=O)[C@H](CCCN=C(N)N)NC(=O)[C@H](CC(C)C)NC(=O)[C@H](NC(=O)[C@H](Cc1ccc(O)cc1)NC(=O)[C@H](CO)NC(=O)[C@H](Cc1c[nH]c2ccccc12)NC(=O)[C@H](Cc1cnc[nH]1)NC(=O)[C@@H]1CCC(=O)N1)C(C)(C)C
- InChI: InChI=1S/C59H84N16O12/c1-7-63-55(85)46-15-11-23-75(46)57(87)40(14-10-22-64-58(60)61)68-50(80)41(24-32(2)3)72-56(86)48(59(4,5)6)74-53(83)42(25-33-16-18-36(77)19-17-33)69-54(84)45(30-76)73-51(81)43(26-34-28-65-38-13-9-8-12-37(34)38)70-52(82)44(27-35-29-62-31-66-35)71-49(79)39-20-21-47(78)67-39/h8-9,12-13,16-19,28-29,31-32,39-46,48,65,76-77H,7,10-11,14-15,20-27,30H2,1-6H3,(H,62,66)(H,63,85)(H,67,78)(H,68,80)(H,69,84)(H,70,82)(H,71,79)(H,72,86)(H,73,81)(H,74,83)(H4,60,61,64)/t39-,40-,41-,42-,43-,44-,45-,46-,48-/m0/s1; Key:XJWIEWPGHRSZJM-MGZASHDBSA-N

Lecirelin, sold under the brand names Dalmarelin, Ovucron, and Reproreline, is a short-acting gonadotropin-releasing hormone agonist (GnRH agonist) medication which is used in veterinary medicine in Europe and Israel. It is a GnRH analogue and a synthetic peptide, specifically a nonapeptide. The drug was introduced for veterinary use by 2000. It is used in form of the acetate salt.

== See also ==
- Gonadotropin-releasing hormone receptor § Agonists
