= Gonadotropin-releasing hormone agonist =

Drug class affecting sex hormones

- Drug class
- Leuprorelin, one of the most widely used GnRH agonists.

Class identifiers
- Synonyms: GnRH receptor agonists; GnRH blockers; GnRH inhibitors; Antigonadotropins
- Use: Fertility medicine; Prostate cancer; Breast cancer; Menorrhagia; Endometriosis; Uterine fibroids; Hyperandrogenism; Hirsutism; Precocious puberty; Transgender people; Chemical castration for paraphilias and sex offenders
- Biological target: GnRH receptor
- Chemical class: Peptides

Legal status

A gonadotropin-releasing hormone agonist (GnRH agonist) is a type of medication which affects gonadotropins and sex hormones. They are used for a variety of indications including in fertility medicine and to lower sex hormone levels in the treatment of hormone-sensitive cancers such as prostate cancer and breast cancer, certain gynecological disorders like heavy periods and endometriosis, high testosterone levels in women, early puberty in children, as a part of transgender hormone therapy, and to delay puberty in transgender youth among other uses. It is also used in the suppression of spontaneous ovulation as part of controlled ovarian hyperstimulation, an essential component in IVF. GnRH agonists are given by injections into fat, as implants placed into fat, and as nasal sprays.

Side effects of GnRH agonists are related to sex hormone deficiency and include symptoms of low testosterone levels and low estrogen levels such as hot flashes, sexual dysfunction, vaginal atrophy, penile atrophy, osteoporosis, infertility, and diminished sex-specific physical characteristics. They are agonists of the GnRH receptor and work by increasing or decreasing the release of gonadotropins and the production of sex hormones by the gonads. When used to suppress gonadotropin release, GnRH agonists can lower sex hormone levels by 95% in both sexes.

GnRH was discovered in 1971, and GnRH analogues were introduced for medical use in the 1980s. Their nonproprietary names usually end in -relin. The most well-known and widely used GnRH analogues are leuprorelin (brand name Lupron) and triptorelin (brand name Decapeptyl). GnRH analogues are available as generic medications. Despite this, they continue to be very expensive.

== Medical uses ==
GnRH agonists are used medically to manage hormone-related conditions such as uterine fibroids and endometriosis, precocious puberty, and hormone-sensitive cancers like prostate and breast cancer, as well as in fertility treatments to control the timing of ovulation. GnRH agonists that have been marketed and are available for medical use include buserelin, gonadorelin, goserelin, histrelin, leuprorelin, nafarelin, and triptorelin. GnRH agonists that are used mostly or exclusively in veterinary medicine include deslorelin and fertirelin. GnRH agonists can be administered by injection, by implant, or intranasally as a nasal spray. Injectables have been formulated for daily, monthly, and quarterly use, and implants are available that can last from one month to a year. With the exception of gonadorelin, which is used as a progonadotropin, all approved GnRH agonists are used as antigonadotropins. The clinically used desensitizing GnRH agonists are available in the following pharmaceutical formulations:

- Short-acting injection (once per day): buserelin, histrelin, leuprorelin, triptorelin
- Long-acting depot injection or injected pellet (once every one to six months): leuprorelin, triptorelin
- Injected implant (once every one to three months): buserelin, goserelin, leuprorelin
- Surgically implanted pellet (once per year): histrelin, leuprorelin
- Nasal spray (two to three times per day): buserelin, nafarelin

=== Cancer ===
Treatment of cancers that are hormonally sensitive and where a hypogonadal state decreases the chances of a recurrence. Thus they are commonly employed in the medical management of prostate cancer and have been used in patients with breast cancer.

=== Puberty ===
GnRH agonists are used in puberty treatment primarily to manage precocious puberty (early onset of puberty) by suppressing the release of sex hormones, to slow pubertal progression until an appropriate age. They are also used in gender-affirming care to delay puberty in transgender and non-binary youth, providing time to explore gender identity before irreversible physical changes occur.

=== Estrogen disorders ===
Management of female disorders that are dependent on estrogen production. Women with menorrhagia, endometriosis, adenomyosis, or uterine fibroids may receive GnRH agonists to suppress ovarian activity and induce a hypoestrogenic state.

=== Sex hormone treatment ===
- Suppressing sex hormone levels in transgender people, especially transgender women.
- Severe cases of hyperandrogenism, such as in congenital adrenal hyperplasia.
- As part of the pharmacologic treatment of paraphilic disorders in sexual offenders or men with a high risk of sexual offending.

=== Fertility treatments ===
A common use of GnRHa is in fertility treatment and assisted reproduction technology. These medications are often used to moderate or reduce increases in luteinizing hormone when a person is preparing for an oocyte retrieval for in vitro fertilization. GNRHa's act as a suppressor of spontaneous ovulation as part of controlled ovarian hyperstimulation, which is an essential component in in vitro fertilisation (IVF). Typically, after GnRH agonists have induced a state of hypoestrogenism, exogenous FSH is given to stimulate ovarian follicle, followed by human chorionic gonadotropins (hCG) to trigger oocyte release. GnRH agonists routinely used for this purpose are: buserelin, leuprorelin, nafarelin, and triptorelin. In addition, GnRHa medications may be used to assist with final maturation induction after having performed controlled ovarian hyperstimulation. Usage of GnRH agonist for this purpose necessitates using a GnRH antagonist instead of a GnRH agonist for suppression of spontaneous ovulation, because using GnRH agonist for that purpose as well inactivates the axis for which it is intended to work for final maturation induction.

Women of reproductive age who undergo cytotoxic chemotherapy have been pretreated with GnRH agonists to reduce the risk of oocyte loss during such therapy and preserve ovarian function. Further studies are necessary to prove that this approach is useful.

=== Summary of available forms ===
GnRH agonists marketed for clinical or veterinary use
| Name | Brand names | Approved uses | Routes | Launch | Hits |
|---|---|---|---|---|---|
| Azagly-nafarelin | Gonazon | Veterinary medicine (assisted reproduction; chemical castration) | Implant; Injection | 2005^{a} | 9,190 |
| Buserelin | Suprefact | Breast cancer; Endometrial hyperplasia; Endometriosis; Female infertility (assisted reproduction); Prostate cancer; Uterine fibroids | Nasal spray; Injection; Implant | 1984 | 253,000 |
| Deslorelin | Ovuplant; Suprelorin | Veterinary medicine (assisted reproduction; chemical castration) | Implant; Injection | 1994 | 85,100 |
| Fertirelin | Ovalyse | Veterinary medicine (assisted reproduction) | Injection | 1981 | 41,000 |
| Gonadorelin | Factrel; Others | Cryptorchidism; Delayed puberty; Diagnostic agent (pituitary disorders); Hypogonadotropic hypogonadism; Veterinary medicine (assisted reproduction) | Injection; Infusion pump; Nasal spray | 1978 | 259,000 |
| Goserelin | Zoladex | Breast cancer; Endometriosis; Female infertility (assisted reproduction); Prostate cancer; Uterine diseases (endometrial thinning agent); Uterine fibroids; Uterine hemorrhage | Implant | 1989 | 400,000 |
| Histrelin | Vantas; Supprelin LA | Precocious puberty; Prostate cancer | Implant | 1993 | 283,000 |
| Lecirelin | Dalmarelin | Veterinary medicine (assisted reproduction) | Injection | 2000^{a} | 19,700 |
| Leuprorelin | Lupron; Eligard; Procren; Prostap; Staladex | Breast cancer; Endometriosis; Menorrhagia; Precocious puberty; Prostate cancer; Uterine fibroids | Injection; Implant | 1985 | 536,000 |
| Nafarelin | Synarel | Precocious puberty; Endometriosis | Nasal spray | 1990 | 117,000 |
| Peforelin | Maprelin | Veterinary medicine (assisted reproduction) | Injection | 2001^{a} | 3,240 |
| Triptorelin | Decapeptyl | Breast cancer; Endometriosis; Female infertility (assisted reproduction); Paraphilias; Precocious puberty; Prostate cancer; Uterine fibroids | Injection | 1986 | 302,000 |

== Contraindications ==
GnRH agonists are pregnancy category X drugs.

== Side effects ==
Common side effects of the GnRH agonists and antagonists include symptoms of hypogonadism such as hot flashes, gynecomastia, fatigue, weight gain, fluid retention, erectile dysfunction and decreased libido. Long term therapy can result in metabolic abnormalities, weight gain, worsening of diabetes and osteoporosis. Rare, but potentially serious adverse events include transient worsening of prostate cancer due to surge in testosterone with initial injection of GnRH agonists and pituitary apoplexy in patients with pituitary adenoma. Single instances of clinically apparent liver injury have been reported with some GnRH agonists (histrelin, goserelin), but the reports were not very convincing. There is no evidence to indicate that there is cross sensitivity to liver injury among the various GnRH analogues despite their similarity in structure. There is also a report that GnRH agonists used in the treatment of advanced prostate cancer may increase the risk of heart problems by 30%.

== Pharmacology ==
GnRH agonists act as agonists of the GnRH receptor, the biological target of gonadotropin-releasing hormone (GnRH). These drugs can be both peptides and small-molecules. They are modeled after the hypothalamic neurohormone GnRH, which interacts with the GnRH receptor to elicit its biologic response, the release of the pituitary hormones follicle-stimulating hormone (FSH) and luteinizing hormone (LH). However, after the initial "flare" response, continued stimulation with GnRH agonists desensitizes the pituitary gland (by causing GnRH receptor downregulation) to GnRH. Pituitary desensitization reduces the secretion of LH and FSH and thus induces a state of hypogonadotropic hypogonadal anovulation, sometimes referred to as "pseudomenopause" or "medical oophorectomy". GnRH agonists are able to completely shut down gonadal testosterone production and thereby suppress circulating testosterone levels by 95% or into the castrate/female range in men.

Agonists do not quickly dissociate from the GnRH receptor. As a result, initially there is an increase in FSH and LH secretion (so-called "flare effect"). Levels of LH may increase by up to 10-fold, while levels of testosterone generally increase to 140 to 200% of baseline values. However, after continuous administration, a profound hypogonadal effect (i.e. decrease in FSH and LH) is achieved through receptor downregulation by internalization of receptors. Generally this induced and reversible hypogonadism is the therapeutic goal. During the flare, peak levels of testosterone occur after 2 to 4 days, baseline testosterone levels are returned to by 7 to 8 days, and castrate levels of testosterone are achieved by two to four weeks. A 7 day study of infertile women found that restoration of normal gonadotropin secretion takes 5 to 8 days after cessation of exogenous GnRH agonists.

Various medications can be used to prevent the testosterone flare and/or its effects at the initiation of GnRH agonist therapy. These include antigonadotropins such as progestogens like cyproterone acetate and chlormadinone acetate and estrogens like diethylstilbestrol, fosfestrol (diethylstilbestrol diphosphate), and estramustine phosphate; antiandrogens such as nonsteroidal antiandrogens like flutamide, nilutamide, and bicalutamide; and androgen synthesis inhibitors such as ketoconazole and abiraterone acetate.

Hormone levels with GnRH agonists and antagonists
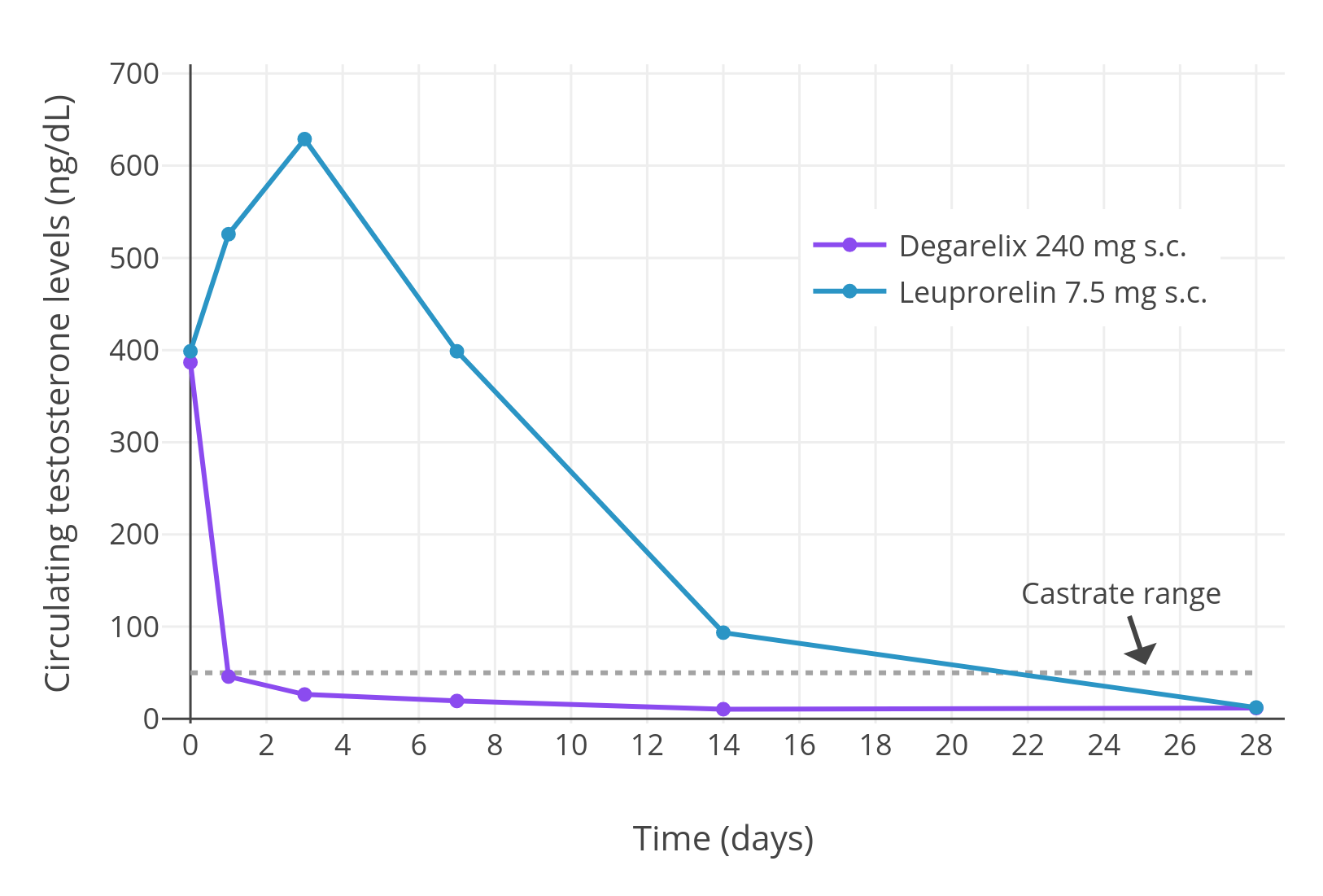
Testosterone levels during the first month of androgen deprivation therapy in men with prostate cancer treated with subcutaneous injections of a GnRH antagonist (degarelix) or agonist (leuprorelin). Doses were 240 then 80 mg/month and 7.5 mg/month, respectively.

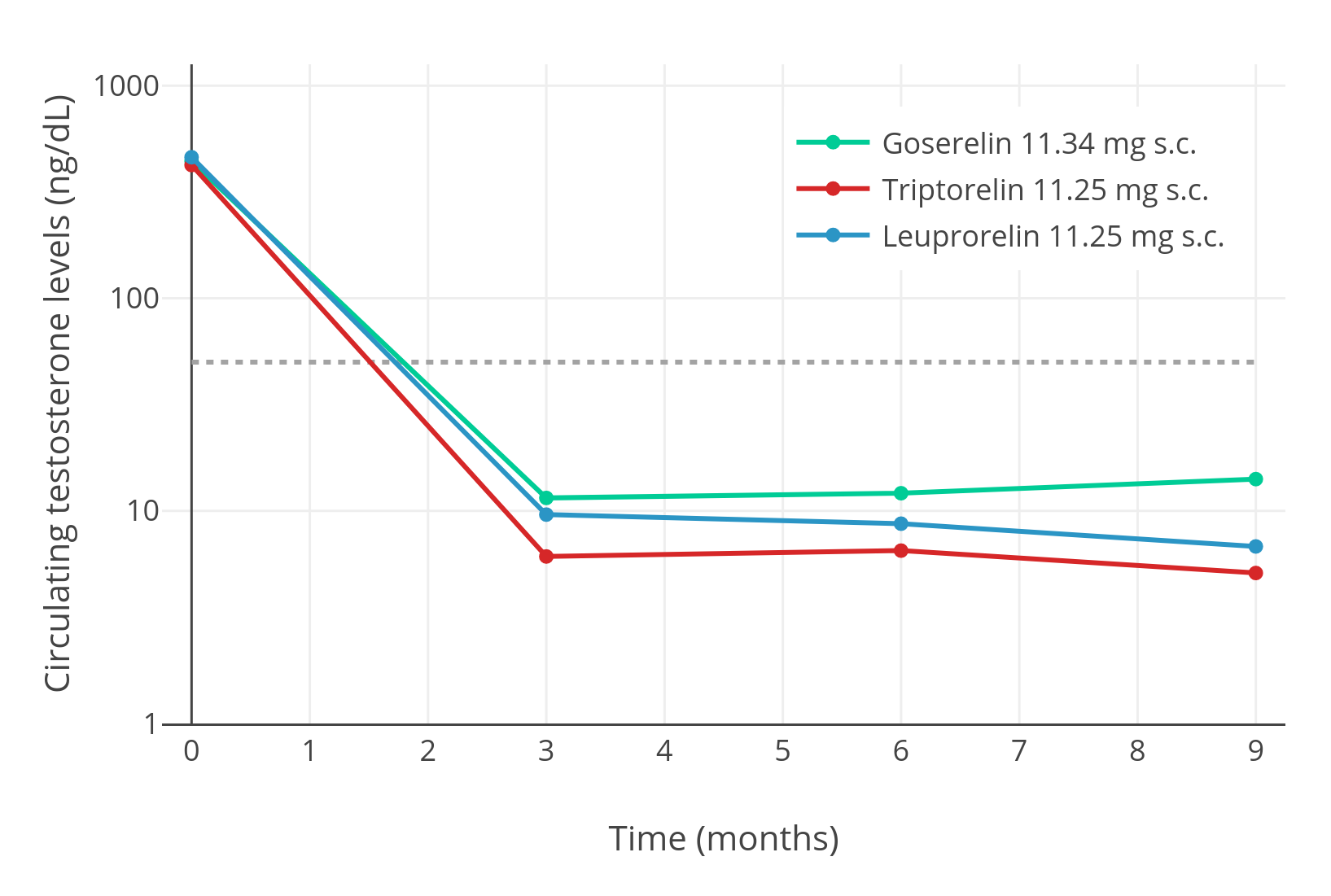
Testosterone levels in the long-term androgen deprivation therapy of men with prostate cancer by different GnRH agonists administered at 3 month intervals (goserelin, triptorelin and leuprorelin). Dotted line is the threshold for the castrate range.

== Chemistry ==
GnRH agonists are synthetically modeled after the natural GnRH decapeptide with specific modifications, usually double and single substitutions and typically in position 6 (amino acid substitution), 9 (alkylation) and 10 (deletion). These substitutions inhibit rapid degradation. Agonists with two substitutions include: leuprorelin, buserelin, histrelin, goserelin, and deslorelin. The agents nafarelin and triptorelin are agonists with single substitutions at position 6.

Chemical structures of GnRH agonists
Buserelin

Deslorelin

Fertirelin

Gonadorelin (GnRH)

Goserelin

Histrelin

Leuprorelin

Nafarelin

Triptorelin

== Veterinary uses ==
GnRH analogues are also used in veterinary medicine. Uses include:

- Temporary suppression of fertility in female dogs
- Induction of ovulation in mares

== See also ==
- Gonadotropin-releasing hormone
- Gonadotropin-releasing hormone antagonist
- Progonadotropin
