= Dénomination Commune Française =

Formal French generic name for a drug

The Dénomination Commune Française (DCF), or "Common French Denomination/Name" in English, is the formal French name for a drug.

== See also ==
- International Nonproprietary Name (INN)
- Denominazione Comune Italiana (DCIT)
- United States Adopted Name (USAN)
- British Approved Name (BAN)
- Australian Approved Name (AAN)
- Japanese Accepted Name (JAN)
