= Precocious puberty =

Puberty occurring at an unusually early age

- Other names: Early puberty
- Specialty: Gynecology, andrology, endocrinology
- Causes: Idiopathic, brain tumor

In medicine, precocious puberty is puberty occurring at an unusually early age. In most cases, the process is normal in every aspect except the unusually early age and simply represents a variation of normal development. There is early development of secondary sex characters and gametogenesis also starts earlier. Precocious puberty is of two types: true precocious puberty and pseudoprecocious puberty. In a minority of children with precocious puberty, the early development is triggered by a disease such as a tumor or injury of the brain.

Even when there is no underlying disease, unusually early puberty can have adverse effects on social behavior and psychological development (having more mature knowledge than one's peers, feeling inadequate, trying to attend and establish friendships with older people, depression). Affected children also face shorter adult height potential and possible lifelong health risks. Central precocious puberty can be treated by suppressing the pituitary hormones that induce sex steroid production. The opposite condition is delayed puberty.

The term is used with several slightly different meanings that are usually apparent from the context. In its broadest sense, and often simplified as early puberty, "precocious puberty" sometimes refers to any physical sex hormone effect, due to any cause, occurring earlier than the usual age, especially when it is being considered as a medical problem. Stricter definitions of "precocity" may refer only to central puberty starting before a statistically specified age based on percentile in the population (e.g., 2.5 standard deviations below the population mean), on expert recommendations of ages at which there is more than a negligible chance of discovering an abnormal cause, or based on opinion as to the age at which early puberty may have adverse effects. A common definition for medical purposes is onset before 8 years in girls or 9 years in boys.

== Causes ==
Early pubic hair, breast, or genital development may result from natural early maturation or from several other conditions.

=== Central ===
If the cause can be traced to the hypothalamus or pituitary, the cause is considered central. Other names for this type are complete or true precocious puberty.

Causes of central precocious puberty can include:

- hypothalamic hamartoma produces pulsatile gonadotropin-releasing hormone (GnRH)
- Langerhans cell histiocytosis
- McCune–Albright syndrome

Central precocious puberty can also be caused by brain tumors, infection (most commonly tuberculous meningitis, especially in developing countries), trauma, hydrocephalus, and Angelman syndrome. Precocious puberty is associated with advancement in bone age, which leads to early fusion of epiphyses, thus resulting in reduced final height and short stature.

Adrenocortical oncocytomas are rare with mostly benign and nonfunctioning tumors. There have been only three cases of functioning adrenocortical oncocytoma that have been reported up until 2013. Children with adrenocortical oncocytomas will present with "premature pubarche, clitoromegaly, and increased serum dehydroepiandrosterone sulfate and testosterone" which are some of the presentations associated with precocious puberty.

Precocious puberty in girls begins before the age of 8. The youngest mother on record is Lina Medina, who gave birth at the age of either 5 years, 7 months and 17 days or 6 years 5 months as mentioned in another report.

"Central precocious puberty (CPP) was reported in some patients with suprasellar arachnoid cysts (SAC), and SCFE (slipped capital femoral epiphysis) occurs in patients with CPP because of rapid growth and changes of growth hormone secretion."

If no cause can be identified, it is considered idiopathic or constitutional.

=== Peripheral ===
Secondary sexual development induced by sex steroids from other abnormal sources is referred to as peripheral precocious puberty or precocious pseudopuberty. It typically presents as a severe form of disease with children. Symptoms are usually as a sequelae from adrenal hyperplasia (because of 21-hydroxylase deficiency or 11-beta hydroxylase deficiency, the former being more common), which includes but is not limited to hypertension, hypotension, electrolyte abnormalities, ambiguous genitalia in females, signs of virilization in females. Blood tests will typically reveal high level of androgens with low levels of cortisol.

Causes can include:

- Endogenous sources
  - Gonadal tumors (such as arrhenoblastoma)
  - Adrenal tumors
  - Germ cell tumor
  - Congenital adrenal hyperplasia
  - McCune–Albright syndrome
  - Silver–Russell syndrome
  - Familial male-limited precocious puberty (testotoxicosis)
- Exogenous hormones
  - Environmental exogenous hormones
  - As treatment for another condition

=== Isosexual and heterosexual ===
Generally, patients with precocious puberty develop phenotypically appropriate secondary sexual characteristics. This is called isosexual precocity.

In some cases, a patient may develop characteristics of the opposite sex. For example, a male may develop breasts and other feminine characteristics, while a female may develop a deepened voice and facial hair. This is called heterosexual or contrasexual precocity. It is very rare in comparison to isosexual precocity and is usually the result of unusual circumstances. As an example, children with a very rare genetic condition called aromatase excess syndrome – in which exceptionally high circulating levels of estrogen are present – usually develop precocious puberty. Males and females are hyper-feminized by the syndrome. The "opposite" case would be the hyper-masculinisation of both male and female patients with congenital adrenal hyperplasia (CAH) due to 21-hydroxylase deficiency, in which there is an excess of androgens. Thus, in the aromatase excess syndrome the precocious puberty is isosexual in females and heterosexual in males, whilst in the CAH it is isosexual in males and heterosexual in females.

=== Research ===
Although the causes of early puberty are still somewhat unclear, girls who have a high-fat diet and are not physically active or are obese are more likely to physically mature earlier. "Obese girls, defined as at least 10 kilograms (22 pounds) overweight, had an 80 percent chance of developing breasts before their ninth birthday and starting menstruation before age 12 – the western average for menstruation is about 12.7 years." In addition to diet and exercise habits, exposure to chemicals that mimic estrogen (known as xenoestrogens) is another possible cause of early puberty in girls. Bisphenol A, a xenoestrogen found in hard plastics, has been shown to affect sexual development. "Factors other than obesity, however, perhaps genetic and/or environmental ones, are needed to explain the higher prevalence of early puberty in black versus white girls." While more girls are increasingly entering puberty at younger ages, new research indicates that some boys are actually starting later (delayed puberty). "Increasing rates of obese and overweight children in the United States may be contributing to a later onset of puberty in boys, say researchers at the University of Michigan Health System."

Limited research also suggests that Adverse Childhood Experiences (ACEs) can influence the age when girls start puberty. The ACE's with significant influence on a girl's development are sexual and physical abuse.

Recent research suggests a link between racial and ethnicity-based discrimination and early puberty, particularly when parents are unsupportive of a child's racial identity. A 2026 study states that self-identification as a sexual minority correlates with earlier puberty compared to a child's heterosexual peers.

High levels of beta-hCG in serum and cerebrospinal fluid observed in a 9-year-old boy suggest a pineal gland tumor. The tumor is called a chorionic gonadotropin secreting pineal tumor. Radiotherapy and chemotherapy reduced tumor and beta-hCG levels normalized.

In a study using neonatal melatonin on rats, results suggest that elevated melatonin could be responsible for some cases of early puberty.

Familial cases of idiopathic central precocious puberty (ICPP) have been reported, leading researchers to believe there are specific genetic modulators of ICPP. Mutations in genes such as LIN28, and LEP and LEPR, which encode leptin and the leptin receptor, have been associated with precocious puberty. The association between LIN28 and puberty timing was validated experimentally in vivo, when it was found that mice with ectopic over-expression of LIN28 show an extended period of pre-pubertal growth and a significant delay in puberty onset.

Mutations in the kisspeptin (KISS1) and its receptor, KISS1R (also known as GPR54), involved in GnRH secretion and puberty onset, are also thought to be the cause for ICPP However, this is still a controversial area of research, and some investigators found no association of mutations in the LIN28 and KISS1/KISS1R genes to be the common cause underlying ICPP.

The gene MKRN3, which is a maternally imprinted gene, was first cloned by Jong et al. in 1999. MKRN3 was originally named Zinc finger protein 127. It is located on human chromosome 15 on the long arm in the Prader-Willi syndrome critical region2, and has since been identified as a cause of premature sexual development or CPP. The identification of mutations in MKRN3 leading to sporadic cases of CPP has been a significant contribution to better understanding the mechanism of puberty. MKRN3 appears to act as a "brake" on the central hypothalamic-pituitary access. Thus, loss of function mutations of the protein allow early activation of the GnRH pathway and cause phenotypic CPP. Patients with a MKRN3 mutation all display the classic signs of CCP including early breast and testes development, increased bone aging and elevated hormone levels of GnRH and LH.

== Diagnosis ==
A charted tanner scale for male genitalia, ranging from delayed to early growth.

Studies indicate that breast development in girls and the appearance of pubic hair in both girls and boys are starting earlier than in previous generations. As a result, "early puberty" in children as young as 8 and 9 is no longer considered abnormal, particularly with girls. Although it is not considered as abnormal, it may be upsetting to parents and can be harmful to children who mature physically at a time when they are immature mentally.

No age reliably separates normal from abnormal processes in children, but the following age thresholds for evaluation are thought to minimize the risk of missing a significant medical problem:

- Breast development in boys before appearance of pubic hair or testicular enlargement
- Pubic hair or genital enlargement (gonadarche) in boys with onset before 9 years
- Pubic hair (pubarche) before 8 or breast development (thelarche) in girls with onset before 7 years
- Menstruation (menarche) in girls before 10 years

Medical evaluation is sometimes necessary to recognize the few children with serious conditions from the majority who have entered puberty early but are still medically normal. Early sexual development warrants evaluation because it may:

- induce early bone maturation and reduce eventual adult height
- indicate the presence of a tumour or other serious problem
- cause the child to become an object of adult sexual interest.

== Treatment ==
One possible treatment is with anastrozole. GnRH agonists, including histrelin, triptorelin, or leuprorelin, are other possible treatments. Non-continuous use of GnRH agonists stimulates the pituitary gland to release follicle stimulating hormone (FSH) and luteinizing hormone (LH). Triptorelin depot is widely used to treat central precocious puberty (CPP) in children.

Puberty blockers work by stabilizing puberty symptoms, decreasing growth velocity, and slowing skeletal maturation. The outcomes of treatment are assessed in terms of height, reproduction, metabolic, and psychosocial measures. The most pronounced effects on height have been seen in children experiencing the onset of puberty before 6 years of age; however there is variability in height outcomes across studies which can be attributed to varying study designs, time of symptom presentation, and time of treatment termination. A study investigating the effects of puberty blockers on reproductive health showed no significant difference in the number of irregular menstrual cycles, pregnancies, or pregnancy outcomes between women who received treatment for precocious puberty and those who opted out of treatment. Individuals with precocious puberty, early adrenarche, and early normal puberty show less stress after treatment compared to individuals without preexisting developmental conditions.

Blockers are also used in the treatment of central precocious puberty resulting from conditions like hypothalamic hamartomas or congenital adrenal hyperplasia, where early onset of puberty is a symptom. Additionally, puberty blockers can be prescribed for children with severe forms of idiopathic short stature, allowing for more time for growth before the closure of growth plates.

In the USA, since 1993, the US Food and Drug Administration (FDA) has supported the use of puberty blockers to treat precocious puberty. Currently under FDA regulation the use of puberty blockers is considered on-label for the treatment of central precocious puberty.

For years, the FDA, Endocrine Society, American Academy of Pediatrics(AAP) and many other pediatric associations have supported the use of Gonadotropin-releasing hormone analogs(GnRHas) in central precocious puberty (CPP).

In 2009, the Lawson Wilkins Pediatric Endocrine Society and European Society for Pediatric Endocrinology published a consensus statement highlighting the effectiveness of Gonadotropin-releasing hormone analogs(GnRHas) in early onset central precocious puberty. They confirmed that the use of Gonadotropin-releasing hormone analogs(GnRHas) has had a positive effect on increasing adult height. However these Endocrine Societies believe additional research should be conducted before routinely suggesting GnRHAs for other conditions. There is still some uncertainty surrounding the effectiveness of GnRHas when utilized for other conditions.

Overall, puberty blockers have demonstrated an excellent safety and efficacy profile in the treatment of precocious puberty.

=== Side effects ===
The most common side effects reported include nonspecific headaches, hot flashes, and implant-related skin reactions.

A systematic review of studies investigating the long-term effects of treating precocious puberty with GnRH agonists found that bone mineral density decreases during treatment but normalizes afterward, with no lasting effects on peak bone mass.

== Prognosis ==
Early puberty is posited to put girls at higher risk of sexual abuse; however, a causal relationship is, as yet, inconclusive. Early puberty also puts girls at a higher risk for teasing or bullying, mental health disorders and short stature as adults. Girls as young as 8 are increasingly starting to menstruate, develop breasts and grow pubic and underarm hair; these "biological milestones" typically occurred only at 13 or older in the past. African-American girls are especially prone to early puberty.

Though boys face fewer problems from early puberty than girls do, early puberty is not always positive for boys. Early sexual maturation in boys can be accompanied by increased aggressiveness due to the surge of pubertal hormones. Because they appear older than their peers, pubescent boys may face increased social pressure to conform to adult norms; society may view them as more emotionally advanced, although their cognitive and social development may lag behind their physical development. Studies have shown that early-maturing boys are more likely to be sexually active and are more likely to participate in risky behaviors.

== History ==
Pubertas praecox is the Latin term used by physicians from the 1790s onward. Various hypotheses and inferences on pubertal (menstrual, procreative) timing are attested since ancient times, which, well into early modernity were explained on the basis of temperamental, humoral and Jungian "complexional" causes, or general or local "plethora" (blood excess).

== See also ==
- Acceleration (human development)
- Heterochrony: Paedomorphosis
- Secular trend: Biological anthropology
- Primary ovarian insufficiency
- List of youngest parents
