= Japanese Accepted Name =

Japanese nonproprietary drug name

A Japanese Accepted Name (Japanese: 日本医薬品一般的名称, Hepburn: Nihon Iyakuhin Ippan-teki Meishō) (JAN) is the official non-proprietary or generic name given to a pharmaceutical substance by the Government of Japan.

== See also ==
- International Nonproprietary Name (INN)
- United States Adopted Name (USAN)
- British Approved Name (BAN)
- Japanese Pharmacopeia
