= Puberty blocker =

Medication used to inhibit puberty

Puberty blockers (also called puberty inhibitors or hormone blockers) are medicines used to postpone puberty. The most commonly used puberty blockers are gonadotropin-releasing hormone (GnRH) agonists, which suppress the natural production of sex hormones, such as androgens (e.g. testosterone) and estrogens (e.g. estradiol). Puberty blockers are used to delay puberty in children with precocious puberty. They are also used to delay the development of unwanted secondary sex characteristics in transgender youth, so as to allow them more time to explore their gender identity under what became known as the Dutch Protocol.

The use of puberty blockers is supported by the Endocrine Society and the World Professional Association for Transgender Health (WPATH). In the United States, twelve major American medical associations, including the American Medical Association, the American Psychological Association, and the American Academy of Pediatrics support the use of puberty blockers. In Australia, four medical organizations support them.

In the 2020s, the provision of puberty blockers for gender dysphoria in children has become the subject of public controversy, with the United Kingdom stopping the routine prescription of puberty blockers and some states of the United States making their use a criminal offense. In 2022, Sweden released updated national guidelines stating that puberty blockers should be limited to "exceptional cases". However, the guidelines do not constitute a ban.

== Medical uses ==
Puberty blockers prevent the development of biological secondary sex characteristics. The same drugs are also used in fertility medicine and to treat some hormone-sensitive cancers in adults.

=== Precocious puberty ===
Puberty blockers are commonly used to delay puberty in children with precocious puberty, a condition that activates the hypothalamic-pituitary-gonadal axis prematurely and initiates puberty at an inappropriate age. The main goal of treatment is to preserve children's adult height potential.

Puberty blockers work by stabilizing puberty symptoms, decreasing growth velocity, and slowing skeletal maturation. The outcomes of treatment are assessed in terms of height, reproduction, metabolic, and psychosocial measures. The most pronounced effects on height have been seen in children experiencing the onset of puberty before 6 years of age; however there is variability in height outcomes across studies which can be attributed to varying study designs, time of symptom presentation, and time of treatment termination.

A study investigating the effects of puberty blockers on reproductive health showed no significant difference in the number of irregular menstrual cycles, pregnancies, or pregnancy outcomes between women who received treatment for precocious puberty and those who opted out of treatment. In terms of psychosocial markers, children diagnosed with precocious puberty have shown body image concerns and demonstrated poor emotional regulation and high anxiety. Individuals with precocious puberty, early adrenarche, and early normal puberty show less stress after treatment compared to individuals without preexisting developmental conditions.

Overall, puberty blockers have demonstrated an excellent safety and efficacy profile for treating precocious puberty. The most common side effects reported include nonspecific headaches, hot flashes, and implant-related skin reactions.

=== Gender dysphoria ===
Puberty blockers are sometimes prescribed to young transgender people with gender dysphoria to temporarily halt the development of secondary sex characteristics. While there is evidence to suggest transgender youth may benefit from gender-affirming hormone therapy (HRT) even at early puberty, there may be restrictions on prescribing HRT at younger ages. Puberty blockers are intended to allow patients more time to solidify their gender identity and give them a smoother transition into their desired gender identity as an adult. If a child later decides not to transition, the medication can be stopped and puberty will proceed.

The "Dutch Protocol" is the first known example of the use of puberty blockers to treat gender dysphoria in children. It was developed by Peggy Cohen-Kettenis in the 1990s. The initial article describing the Dutch Protocol stated that the treatment was reversible and that a study of 54 children showed evidence that it had an overall positive outcome for those treated. A number of subsequent studies supported the treatment as safe and effective at delaying development of secondary sexual characteristics, and it became the standard treatment in the field.

==== Research ====
Studies examining the effects of puberty blockers for gender non-conforming and transgender adolescents have indicated that these treatments are reasonably safe and reversible. While research on long-term effects remains limited, especially regarding bone health, cognitive function, and fertility, available evidence supports the use of puberty blockers as part of gender-affirming care, as these treatments can improve psychological well-being in trans individuals. Treatment of transgender adolescents with puberty blockers, especially when followed by gender-affirming hormone therapy, has been shown to reduce depression, anxiety, and suicidality. The World Professional Association for Transgender Health's Standards of Care 8, published in 2022, declared puberty-blocking medication to be medically necessary and recommends them for usage in transgender adolescents once the patient has reached Tanner stage 2 of development, because longitudinal data shows improved outcomes for transgender patients who receive them.

A 2014 longitudinal study followed 55 young transgender adults (22 trans women and 33 trans men) over the entire duration of their puberty. Participants were assessed prior to puberty suppression around mean age 13-14, followed by another assessment at the beginning of gender-affirming hormones being introduced around mean age 16-17 and a post-adolescence review following a year or longer after gender-affirming surgery at a mean age of 20-21. The results of the longitudinal study found that gender dysphoria decreased and psychological health steadily improved and concluded that a multidisciplinary team of mental health professionals working together with physicians and surgeons and informed administration of puberty blockers, followed by cross-sex hormones and gender affirming surgery led to positive health outcomes, mental and physical for study participants.

A 2022 study published in the Journal of the American Medical Association found a 60% reduction in depression and 73% reduction in suicidality in transgender patients prescribed puberty blockers or gender affirming hormones.

In September 2024, the New South Wales government in Australia released an independent review into puberty blockers that they commissioned which found that the benefits of puberty blockers (including positive results relating to body image, gender dysphoria, depression, anxiety, suicide risk, quality of life, and cognitive function) outweigh any possible risks. The review concluded that puberty blockers are "safe, effective and reversible".

A multi-year study published in September 2024 found that restrictions to transgender care, including restriction on access to gender-affirming puberty blockers, showed a direct link to negative mental health outcomes for transgender youth. The study followed the enactment of several laws in US states on restricting such access, which led to an increase of suicide attempts of 7-72% in transgender youth within one to two years following the enactment of laws restricting access.

A 2024 systematic review, which ranked studies it analyzed into quality buckets, found that synthesis of the available "moderate-quality and high-quality studies showed consistent evidence demonstrating efficacy for suppressing puberty." The review noted that there was limited, or inconsistent evidence in other regards, saying that they could not draw conclusions on the "impact on gender dysphoria, mental and psychosocial health or cognitive development." The review noted a current lack of high-quality research on puberty blockers in adolescence experiencing gender dysphoria and that "large well- designed research is needed" to better inform this area for the future.

In January 2025, a systematic review led by Gordon Guyatt found the evidence surrounding puberty blockers to be of low certainty in relation to global function, depression, gender dysphoria, bone mineral density, and progression to cross-sex hormones. Some studies showed improvements while others showed little to no change. Guyatt said that he was worried the results would be misused to justify denying blockers to trans youth seeking them, that banning care based on the evidence being low certainty was "a clear violation of the principles of evidence-based shared decision-making and is unconscionable", and that patient autonomy should be supported.

In May 2025, a systematic review on the use of puberty blockers in adolescents was published in Frontiers in Endocrinology. It found that puberty blockers led to "significantly improved" mental health outcomes, "especially when GnRHa was followed by gender-affirming hormone therapy." The review said that "key clinical and ethical considerations—such as bone health monitoring, fertility counseling, psychological support, and informed decision-making—must guide treatment." The review recommends gender-affirming care such as puberty blockers for adolescents, along with professional mental health support. It also recommended further longitudinal studies to support safe and individualized care, noting the current lack of long-term data and a need for further study, highlighting areas of fertility preservation and skeletal health.

==== Informed consent ====
Many medical groups recommend administration of gender-affirming health care under an informed consent model, which helps patients make an informed decision about the benefits and potential risks associated with treatment, such as puberty blockers. Medical researchers continue building on the discussion on informed consent. A 2019 study recommended that a "multidisciplinary approach" is necessary "to ensure meaningful consent" is acquired and treatment is initiated with a strong ethical foundation. A 2021 editorial adds a pragmatic perspective, claiming that "disproportionate emphasis is given to young people's inability to provide medical consent" and that "what matters ethically is whether an individual has a good enough reason for wanting treatment". Bioethicist Maura Priest shares this perspective. She claims that even in the absence of parental permission, the use of puberty blockers could mitigate any adverse effects on familial relationships within the home of a transgender child and that the psychological costs associated with untreated gender dysphoria in children are avoidable. Another bioethicist, Florence Ashley, adds that counseling and educating the parents of transgender youth could also be beneficial to familial relationships.

== Types ==
Puberty blocker medications are used to delay the physical changes associated with puberty. The most common type of puberty blockers are gonadotropin-releasing hormone (GnRH) antagonists, such as leuprolide acetate and histrelin acetate, which suppress the release of sex hormones like testosterone and estrogen. These medications are typically administered via injections or implants. Another type of puberty blocker is progestins, such as medroxyprogesterone acetate, which can be taken orally or by injection and work by reducing the body's production of sex hormones. In some cases, aromatase inhibitors are used off-label to block the conversion of androgens into estrogens, although they are less commonly prescribed. Each type of medication has specific benefits and potential side effects, and the choice of which to use depends on the individual's medical needs and the advice of their healthcare provider.

A number of different drugs are used as puberty blockers:

- Gonadotropin-releasing hormone (GnRH) agonists: Specific examples include: buserelin, histrelin, leuprorelin, nafarelin, and triptorelin. GnRH agonists are available and used as daily subcutaneous injections, depot subcutaneous or intramuscular injections lasting 1 to 6 months, implants lasting 12 months, and nasal sprays used multiple times per day. A 2024 review found GnRH agonists to be the most effective treatment for puberty suppression.
- GnRH antagonists are also expected to be effective at delaying puberty but have not yet been widely studied or used for this purpose. Examples of GnRh antagonists include ganirelix and cetrorelix, drugs that are typically used to treat infertility.
- Progestogens used at high doses such as medroxyprogesterone acetate and cyproterone acetate have been used as puberty blockers in the past or when GnRH agonists are not possible. For precocious puberty, they are not as effective as GnRH agonists (especially in avoiding a hit to adult height) and have more side effects. They are cheaper than GnRH agonists and potentially have fewer side effects for individuals with gender dysphoria (very small sample size).
- Antiandrogens: Bicalutamide has been used as a cheaper alternative puberty blocker in transgender girls for whom GnRH agonists were denied by insurance. The antiandrogens spironolactone and cyproterone acetate are not as strong.

=== Medical labelling ===
Puberty blockers have not received FDA approval for use on children who are transgender, and are instead issued off-label. The practice of off-label prescription is common in children's medicine because many drugs lack pediatric-specific information in their marketing authorisation or approval. Doctors use their professional judgment to decide how to use these drugs, and the term "off-label" itself does not indicate an improper, illegal, or experimental use of medicine. According to pediatric endocrinology expert Brad Miller, pharmaceutical companies that make puberty blocker drugs for children with gender dysphoria have refused to submit them for FDA approval because doing so would cost too much money and "because (transgender treatment) was a political hot potato."

=== Manufacturers ===
In the United States, the main providers of puberty blockers are Endo International and AbbVie. Endo International creates histerelin acetate (Vantas) while AbbVie manufactures leuprolide acetate (Lupron Depot). Other companies within the United States are also in the mix such as Pfizer who distributes histerelin acetate (Supprelin LA) and Tolmar Pharmaceuticals who create their own leuprolide acetate (Fensolvi).

Outside of the United States, companies such as Ferring Pharmaceuticals, Ipsen, Takeda Pharmaceutical Company, Astellas Pharma, Sandoz, and Sun Pharmaceutical Industries supply much of the rest of the world with the various puberty blockers. Ferring Pharmaceuticals, based out of Switzerland, generate two separate products of triptorelin (Decapeptyl and Gonapeptyl). Originating in France, Ipsen also produces triptorelin (Decapeptyl). German/Swiss company Sandoz makes leuprorelin (Leuprorelin Acetate, Lucrin, Eligard). In Japan, Takeda Pharmaceutical Company and Astellas Pharma create leuprorelin (Lupron Depot) and goserelin (Zoladex). Indian company Sun Pharmaceutical Industries mainly produces leuprolide acetate generic injectables. AbbVie is also a player internationally.

== Effects ==
=== Short-term ===
In the short term, they are generally considered safe and well-tolerated by most individuals. One of the primary effects is the suppression of secondary sexual characteristics, such as breast development in those assigned female at birth or deepening of the voice in those assigned male at birth. This can significantly alleviate gender dysphoria in transgender youth.

Common short-term side effects may include injection site reactions, headaches, mood swings, changes in weight or appetite, fatigue, insomnia, muscle aches and changes in breast tissue, but these are usually manageable. Bone mineral density is reduced during treatment, though there is no evidence of long-term effects (see also § Bone health in § Long-term). To protect against this, doctors recommend exercise, calcium, and Vitamin D. The American Academy of Pediatrics (AAP) also notes delaying puberty beyond peers may be stressful.

In 2016, the FDA ordered drugmakers to add warning labels that state: "Psychiatric events have been reported in patients", including symptoms "such as crying, irritability, impatience, anger and aggression."

In 2022, the FDA reported that there have been six cases of idiopathic intracranial hypertension in 5 to 12-year-old children assigned female at birth taking puberty blockers. Five were receiving treatment for precocious puberty and one was transgender and receiving treatment for gender dysphoria. Morissa Ladinsky, a University of Alabama-Birmingham pediatrician who works with transgender youth, said that it "is an inordinately well-known side effect that can happen for many, many different medications, most commonly, oral birth control pills." Referring to the six reported cases, Ladinsky said that "It doesn't even approach any semblance of what we call in medicine, statistical significance".

=== Long-term ===
Although puberty blockers are known to be safe and fully reversible if stopped in the short term, it is not known whether they affect the development of factors like bone mineral density, brain development and fertility in transgender patients.

The Endocrine Society Guidelines, while endorsing the use of puberty blockers for treatment of gender dysphoria, underscores the need for more rigorous safety and effectiveness evaluations and careful assessment of "the effects of prolonged delay of puberty in adolescents on bone health, gonadal function, and the brain (including effects on cognitive, emotional, social, and sexual development)."

The longest follow-up study followed a transgender man who began taking puberty blockers at age 13 in 1998, before later taking hormone treatments and getting gender confirmation surgery as an adult. His health was monitored for 22 years and at age 35 in 2010 was well-functioning, in good physical health with normal metabolic, endocrine, and bone mineral density levels. There were no clinical signs of a negative impact on brain development from taking puberty blockers.

==== Neurological ====
Research on the long-term effects on brain development and cognitive function is limited. According to a 2024 systematic review, no conclusions can be drawn about the effects of puberty blockers on cognitive development.

==== Fertility ====
Research on the long-term effects on fertility is limited. In males treated for precocious puberty, sperm production was reported 8 months to 3 years after cessation of puberty blockers. However, sperm count may be reduced below normal levels. In females, no studies have reported long-term adverse effects on ovarian function after cessation of puberty blockers. However, the time from cessation of treatment to spontaneous ovulation is not known. Due to limited research on the topic, treatment guidelines often advise counseling on fertility preservation options, such as sperm or egg banking, before initiating long-term puberty blocker treatment.

==== Sexual function ====
As of 2025, the only known study of the long-term effects of puberty blockers on sexual function and libido in transgender individuals reported no negative effects.

According to a 2020 study, genital tissue in transgender women may not be optimal for potential vaginoplasty later in life due to underdevelopment of the penis when using penile inversion vaginoplasty. Several other methods such as bowel vaginoplasty, which uses part of the sigmoid colon to form the canal instead, or a peritoneal pull-through vaginoplasty which harvests a skin graft from the peritoneum are not affected by this as they do not require the penile tissue to form the vaginal canal.

==== Bone health ====
A systematic review of studies investigating the long-term effects of treating precocious puberty with GnRH agonists found that bone mineral density decreases during treatment but normalizes afterward, with no lasting effects on peak bone mass. A review focused on the treatment of adolescents experiencing gender dysphoria found that bone health may be compromised during treatment, although the long-term outcomes of puberty suppression alone were not possible to determine. A separate review found that gender-affirming hormone therapy was effective at reversing the bone mineral density losses that may occur during puberty suppression.

== Access ==
The prescription of puberty blockers has been a polarizing issue on an international scale. Proponents argue that there are psychological and developmental benefits of puberty blockers which may outweigh the risks associated with treatment. These benefits include lower mental health risks, lower depression, and reduced behavioral issues. Opponents of the use of puberty blockers argue that minors are unable to provide informed consent.

More than a dozen major American and Australian medical associations, as well as the World Professional Association for Transgender Health (WPATH), and the Endocrine Society generally support puberty blockers for transgender youth and have come out against efforts to restrict their use. A few countries such as the United Kingdom have limited the use of puberty blockers. These countries have not outright banned or criminalized the treatment, however, unlike many US States.

According to Transgender Europe, as of late 2024, two-thirds of European Union member states allow trans youth to access puberty blockers. Additionally, they noted that member states of the European Union were not moving towards bans and there was "significant disinformation around the real state of affairs" of trans-specific care, though transgender people were still often pathologized and mandated to undergo psychiatric diagnosis.

=== Guidelines by country ===
==== Australia ====
Access to puberty blockers for transgender youth in Australia is supported by:

- The Royal Australasian College of Physicians,
- The Royal Australian College of General Practitioners,
- The Australian Endocrine Society,
- AusPATH.

An independent review into gender-affirming care for minors commissioned by the New South Wales government and released in September 2024 found that puberty blockers are "safe, effective and reversible", while acknowledging that the evidence for this and other interventions "remains weak due to poor study designs, low participant numbers and single-centre recruitment", calling for more long-term research.

===== Queensland ban =====
In January 2025, shortly after assuming office, Queensland Health Minister Tim Nicholls under the right-wing Queensland Liberal Party announced an immediate pause on the prescription of puberty blockers (Stage 1 treatment) and cross-sex hormones (Stage 2 treatment) for new patients under 18 with gender dysphoria in Queensland's public health services, pending an independent review of evidence and best practices. The directive, issued by Queensland Health Director-General David Rosengren, exempted existing patients and allowed non-pharmacological support such as counselling, citing "contested evidence" on benefits and risks, including reports of treatments provided to children as young as 12 without adequate oversight. In November 2025, the opposition left-wing Queensland Labor Party passed a motion opposing the ban.

The policy, the first such ban in an Australian state, faced legal challenge from a parent of a transgender teenager, who argued it was procedurally flawed and politically motivated. On 27 October 2025, the Queensland Supreme Court ruled the directive unlawful, finding Rosengren had failed to conduct required consultations with Hospital and Health Service executives (limited to a 22-minute Microsoft Teams meeting concurrent with Nicholls's media announcement) under the Hospital and Health Boards Act 2011. Justice Peter Callaghan set aside the order, describing it as an improper exercise of power, though he did not rule on its substantive merits.

Hours later, on 28 October 2025, Nicholls exercised his ministerial discretion under section 44 of the Act to issue a new directive reinstating the restrictions in substantially the same terms, applying immediately to all public Hospital and Health Services. It mandates multidisciplinary panel approval for any exceptions and prioritises psychological interventions, pending the review's completion (expected November 2025) and a further evidence assessment by January 2026. Nicholls justified the action as necessary "in the public interest" to protect children amid ongoing debates over treatment efficacy. A legal challenge against the new directive was filed in December 2025.

The ban has drawn criticism from medical bodies like the Australian Medical Association, left-wing political parties and LGBTQ+ advocates, who contend it undermines clinical autonomy, evidence-based care, and access for vulnerable youth, potentially exacerbating inequities by pushing families toward private services.

==== Austria ====
In Austria, puberty blockers may be recommended for transgender adolescents once they begin showing the first physical signs of puberty. To be eligible, they must have a stable, long-term experience of gender identity that differs from their assigned sex.

This requires a formal diagnosis of gender incongruence (ICD-11 HA60) from a medical professional, and the adolescent must have reached at least Tanner stage 2 of pubertal development.

The use of puberty blockers in youth experiencing gender dysphoria has been endorsed by the following organizations:

- Österreichische Gesellschaft für Kinder- und Jugendpsychiatrie (Austrian Society for Child and Adolescent Psychiatry) (ÖGKJP)
- Österreichische Gesellschaft für Gynäkologie und Geburtshilfe (Austrian Society of Gynecology and Obstetrics) (OEGGG)

==== Canada ====
The British Columbia Infants Act of 1996 grants minors legal decision-making authority if they can consent to a clinical intervention and their healthcare provider believes it is in their best interest. As a result, providers are required to evaluate if their patients have a robust and realistic understanding of hormone therapy, risks, benefits, and alternatives. Although some incorporate the gender-affirming care model into practice, others demonstrate reluctance to prescribe puberty blockers.

A qualitative study investigating the experience of trans youth in seeking and receiving gender-affirming care at Canadian specialty clinics shows a mix of positive and negative outcomes. People reported improvements in their well-being, frustrations with treatment protocols and wait lists, and concerns with their transition journey.

According to the Canadian Pediatric Society in 2024, "Current evidence shows puberty blockers to be safe when used appropriately, and they remain an option to be considered within a wider view of the patient's mental and psychosocial health."

==== Chile ====
The following medical organizations have expressed their support for puberty blockers for transgender children and adolescents:

- The Chilean Pediatric Society
- The Chilean Society of Psychiatry and Neurology of Childhood and Adolescence
- The Chilean Society of Childhood and Adolescent Gynecology

==== China ====
The 2022 "Chinese expert consensus on multi-disciplinary diagnosis and treatment of transsexualism" recommends puberty blockers as a treatment for transgender youth. As of 2025, there are 7 medical centers that provide treatment to transgender youth in China and 3 of those offer puberty suppression as a treatment option.

==== Denmark ====
Danish guidelines published in 2023 recommend the use of puberty blockers on transgender patients at either Tanner stage two or three, as a means of buying time for patients to consider their gender more fully before making a decision.

==== Finland ====
In 2020, Finland revised its guidelines to prioritise psychotherapy over medical transition. However, these guidelines are a recommendation, not a mandate. The Council for Choices in Health Care allows the use of puberty blockers in transgender children after a case-by-case assessment if there are no medical contraindications.

==== France ====
Transgender children in France are eligible for puberty blockers with parental permission at any age.

In 2022, France's Académie Nationale de Médecine urged caution when considering puberty blockers due to potential side effects, including "impact on growth, bone weakening, [and] risk of infertility". This change to the guidelines has not changed actual practice.

In late 2024, the French Society of Pediatric Endocrinology and Diabetology released the country's first ever guidelines for medical care of trans youth, in which they recommended patients who have hit at least Tanner stage 2 to receive puberty blockers along with calcium and vitamin D supplements.

==== Germany ====
Transgender healthcare guidelines published by the Association of the Scientific Medical Societies in Germany recommend that the use of puberty-suppressing medication be considered for young individuals who have attained at least Tanner stage 2 of pubertal development. A prerequisite is a diagnosis of persistent gender incongruence (as per ICD-11 HA60).

The use of puberty blockers has been endorsed by numerous medical organizations:

- Deutsche Gesellschaft für Kinder- und Jugendpsychiatrie, Psychosomatik und Psychotherapie (German Society for Child and Adolescent Psychiatry, Psychosomatics and Psychotherapy) (DGKJP)
- Akademie für Ethik in der Medizin (Academy for Ethics in Medicine) (AEM)
- Deutsche Ärztliche Gesellschaft für Verhaltenstherapie (German Medical Society for Behavioral Therapy) (DÄVT)
- Deutsche Gesellschaft für Endokrinologie (German Society for Endocrinology) (DGE)
- Deutsche Gesellschaft für Gynäkologie und Geburtshilfe (German Society for Gynecology and Obstetrics) (DGGG)
- Deutsche Gesellschaft für Kinder- und Jugendmedizin (German Society for Pediatric and Adolescent Medicine) (DGKJ)
- Deutsche Gesellschaft für pädiatrische und adoleszente Endokrinologie und Diabetologie (German Society for Pediatric and Adolescent Endocrinology and Diabetology) (DGPAED)
- Deutsche Gesellschaft für Medizinische Psychologie (German Society for Medical Psychology) (DGMP)
- Deutsche Gesellschaft für Psychiatrie und Psychotherapie, Psychosomatik und Nervenheilkunde (German Society for Psychiatry and Psychotherapy, Psychosomatics and Neurology) (DGPPN)
- Deutsche Gesellschaft für Psychoanalyse, Psychotherapie, Psychosomatik und Tiefenpsychologie (German Society for Psychoanalysis, Psychotherapy, Psychosomatics and Depth Psychology) (DGPT)
- Deutsche Gesellschaft für Sexualforschung (German Society for Sex Research) (DGfS)
- Deutsches Kollegium für Psychosomatische Medizin (German College for Psychosomatic Medicine) (DKPM)
- Bundesverband für Kinder- und Jugendlichenpsychotherapie e.V. (Federal Association for Child and Adolescent Psychotherapy) (bkj)
- Berufsverband Deutscher Psychologinnen und Psychologen (Professional Association of German Psychologists) (BDP)
- Berufsverband für Kinder und Jugendpsychiatrie, Psychosomatik und Psychotherapie (Professional Association for Child and Adolescent Psychiatry, Psychosomatics, and Psychotherapy) (BKJPP)
- Bundesarbeitsgemeinschaft der Leitenden Klinikärzte für Kinder- und Jugendpsychiatrie, -psychosomatik und -psychotherapie (Federal Association of Senior Clinicians for Child and Adolescent Psychiatry, Psychosomatics, and Psychotherapy) (BAG)
- Bundespsychotherapeutenkammer (Federal Chamber of Psychotherapists) (BPtK)
- Deutsche Psychoanalytische Gesellschaft (German Psychoanalytic Society) (DPG)
- Deutsche Gesellschaft für Systemische Therapie, Beratung und Familientherapie (German Society for Systemic Therapy, Counseling, and Family Therapy) (DGSF)
- Gesellschaft für Sexualwissenschaft (Society for Sexology) (GSW)
- Kinder- und Jugendlichenpsychotherapie Verhaltenstherapie (Child and Adolescent Psychotherapy and Behavioral Therapy) (KJPVT)
- Verband für lesbische, schwule, bisexuelle, trans*, intersexuelle und queere Menschen in der Psychologie (Association for Lesbian, Gay, Bisexual, Trans*, Intersex, and Queer People in Psychology) (VLSP)
- Vereinigung Analytischer Kinder- und Jugendlichenpsychotherapeuten in Deutschland (Association of Analytical Child and Adolescent Psychotherapists in Germany) (VAKJP)

==== Italy ====
In 2018, the Italian National Bioethics Committee and the Italian Medicines Agency released an opinion that was supportive of the use of puberty blockers in adolescents with gender dysphoria on a case-by-case basis and with some safeguards. However, they also called for more research to better understand its effects. As of February 2019, puberty blockers and cross sex hormones are provided free of charge in Italy and are covered by the National Health Service. Still, challenges with accessing puberty blocker medications persist. Specific clinical criteria must be satisfied for treatment including comprehensive medical evaluations, parental consent, and the exhaustion of all other clinical interventions.

Additionally, the use of puberty blockers in transgender youth is supported by:

- The Italian Society of Endocrinology (SIE)
- The Italian Society of Andrology and Sexual Medicine (SIAMS)
- The Italian Society of Gender, Identity and Health (SIGIS)
- The Italian Academy of Pediatrics
- The Italian Society of Pediatrics
- The Italian Society for Pediatric Endocrinology and Diabetes
- The Italian Society of Adolescent Medicine
- The Italian Society of Child and Adolescent Neuropsychiatry

In October 2025, the Italian Medicines Agency (AIFA) reported they found no evidence to alter their evaluation of the risk-benefit ratio for puberty blockers.

==== Japan ====
The Japanese Society of Psychiatry and Neurology (JSPN) published its updated guidelines in August 2024 on the treatment of gender dysphoria. The guidelines continued to recommend puberty suppression in trans patients, noting it is "self-evident" that, unless puberty is suppressed, development of sex characteristics are irreversible in people who were assigned male at birth. They made recommendations that doctors administering such treatment report more detailed information on outcomes going forward.

==== Mexico ====
In June 2020, the Mexican federal government released "The Protocol for Access without Discrimination to Health Care Services for Lesbian, Gay, Bisexual, Transsexual, Transvestite, Transgender, and Intersex Persons and Specific Care Guidelines." The guidelines are used in healthcare facilities administered by the government. The guidelines state that the process of identifying one's sexual orientation, gender identity and/or expression can occur at early ages. Thus, the guidelines recommend that medical facilities and doctors consider the use of puberty blockers and cross-sex hormones as a treatment for transgender minors when appropriate. In addition to the guidelines, multiple Mexican states have modified their civil codes to recognize gender-affirming healthcare as a right for transgender people under the age of eighteen.

==== Netherlands ====
The Dutch Ministry of Health, Welfare and Sport publishes guidelines recommending the use of puberty blockers in transgender adolescents of at least Tanner Stage II with informed consent and approval of an endocrinologist. This guideline, published in 2016, is endorsed by the following Dutch medical organizations:

- Nederlands Internisten Vereniging (Dutch Internists Association)
- Nederlands Huisartsen Genootschap (Dutch Society of General Practitioners)
- Nederlands Instituut van Psychologen (Dutch Institute of Psychologists)
- Nederlandse Vereniging voor Kindergeneeskunde (Dutch Association for Pediatrics)
- Nederlandse Vereniging voor Obstetrie & Gynaecologie (Dutch Association for Obstetrics & Gynaecology)
- Nederlandse Vereniging voor Plastische Chirurgie (Dutch Association for Plastic Surgery)
- Nederlandse Vereniging voor Psychiatrie (Dutch Psychiatry Association)
- Transvisie (Transvision, a patient organization for transgender patients)

In July 2026, the Dutch Health Board released a review with updated guidance, recommending puberty blockers and other gender-affirming medical care for use in transgender youth. The review cited the harms of delaying treatment and noted that scientific research shows improvements in mental health and that the regret rate is low.

==== New Zealand ====
The use of puberty blockers for transgender people is supported by:

- The Professional Association for Transgender Health Aotearoa (PATHA)
- The Royal Australian and New Zealand College of Psychiatrists (RANZCP)
- The Society of Youth Health Professionals Aotearoa New Zealand (SYHPANZ)
- The New Zealand Sexual Health Society
- The New Zealand Society of Endocrinology
- The College of Child and Youth Nurses
- The New Zealand College of Clinical Psychologists
- The New Zealand Pediatrics Society
- The New Zealand Psychological Society
- The Auckland Sexual Health Service

In November 2024, the Ministry of Health released an evidence brief on puberty blockers. The brief found there to be a lack of evidence for both the efficacy and harms of puberty blockers and recommended "a more precautionary approach". The country did not ban puberty blockers and one doctor who provides the treatments in New Zealand said it "would not change the way in which he practiced". In April 2025, potential further restrictions on access to puberty blockers proposed by the ministry were met with backlash by a number of New Zealand medical bodies. On November 19, 2025, the Ministry of Health under the right-wing New Zealand First and ACT party coalition and led by Simeon Brown, announced a ban on puberty blockers for minors with gender dysphoria set to take effect on December 19, 2025. Minors with gender dysphoria already on puberty blockers will be able to continue them and the drug will also remain available for other uses like early onset puberty. Brown cited the Cass Review in his decision and said the ban will remain in place until the completion of the United Kingdom's clinical trial on puberty blockers. The ban was strongly condemned by the Royal Australian and New Zealand College of Psychiatrists (RANZCP), the Professional Association for Transgender Health Aotearoa (PATHA) and multiple other doctors in New Zealand. The ban was also condemned by the opposition centre-left Labour Party as well as members of the Green Party. On December 17, 2025, the Wellington High Court granted an injunction preventing the ban from being enforced while a full judicial review is pending.

On 21 October 2026, the High Court ruled that the Government's 2025 regulations banning new puberty blocker prescriptions for children and young people with gender dysphoria were unlawful. The ruling was welcomed by PATHA president Jennifer Shields and vice president Dr Elizabeth McElrea, who said that moves to restrict transgender rights were "rooted in disinformation" and that decisions about this healthcare were best made by patients and their doctors. By contrast, Family First New Zealand chief executive Bob McCoskrie condemned the High Court and accused them of siding with activists over vulnerable children. Similarly, New Zealand First leader Winston Peters called on the Health Minister to appeal the High Court ruling. A spokesperson for the Health Minister said the Government was committed to introducing new safeguards for puberty blockers while ensuring that patients with medical needs could still access healthcare.

==== Norway ====
In 2020, the Norwegian Directorate for Health, the governmental body that develops health guidelines, released one for gender incongruence recommending puberty blockers between Tanner stage 2 and the age of 16 following an interdisciplinary assessment, stating they were reversible and there is no reliable evidence of adverse long-term effects.

In 2023, the Norwegian Healthcare Investigation Board, an independent non-governmental organization, issued a non-binding report finding "there is insufficient evidence for the use of puberty blockers and cross sex hormone treatments in young people" and recommending changing to a cautious approach. The Norwegian Healthcare Investigation Board is not responsible for setting healthcare policy, and the Directorate, which is, has not implemented the recommendations, though they have said they are considering them. Misinformation that Norway had banned gender affirming care proliferated on social media.

==== Sweden ====
Sweden's Karolinska Institute, administrator of the second-largest hospital system in the country, announced in March 2021 that it would discontinue providing puberty blockers or cross-sex hormones to children under 16. Additionally, the Karolinska Institute changed its policy to cease providing puberty blockers or cross-sex hormones to teenagers 16–18, outside of approved clinical trials. On February 22, 2022, Sweden's National Board of Health and Welfare released updated national guidelines that state puberty blockers should be limited to "exceptional cases". According to PolitiFact, these are recommendations and do not equate to a ban on the treatment as physicians and clinics such as Karolinska have latitude deciding which cases qualify. Youth in Sweden are still able to access the treatment at other providers when doctors deem it medically necessary, albeit with long wait times. The treatment is not banned in Sweden and is offered as part of its national healthcare service. However, misinformation that Sweden banned puberty blockers has proliferated on social media and some Republican politicians in the United States have used this misinformation to justify banning puberty blockers outright. Nationwide data from the National Board of Health and Welfare released in 2026 found that the number of trans children prescribed puberty blockers in Sweden had actually slightly increased in the years since the board issued their 2022 guidelines.

==== United Kingdom ====
As of May 2024, prescription of puberty blockers to new patients under 18 for the treatment of gender dysphoria is banned for both private medical practices (by a law in parliament in May) and the official state healthcare National Health Service (NHS) which stopped their use earlier, in the aftermath of the Cass Review except for use in clinical research trials.

Previously, on 30 June 2020, the NHS changed its website, replacing the statement that puberty blockers were "fully reversible" and that "treatment can usually be stopped at any time"; with "little is known about the long-term side effects of hormone or puberty blockers in children with gender dysphoria.

A 2020 commissioned review published by the UK's National Institute for Health and Care Excellence (NICE) concluded that the quality of evidence for puberty blocker outcomes (for mental health, quality of life and impact on gender dysphoria) was of very low certainty based on a modified GRADE approach, but that it was plausible that the outcomes would have been worse without treatment. A subsequent systematic review re-affirmed the conclusions of the NICE report, concluding that the currently available studies have "significant conceptual and methodological flaws". A 2024 review of evidence on behalf of the Cass Review came to a similar conclusion.

The NICE review has been criticized by organizations that support the use of puberty blockers such as WPATH and EPATH, and in a WPATH International Journal of Transgender Health article by Cal Horton for excluding studies combining puberty blockers and hormone therapy, and also by parents of transgender youth for excluding evidence of its safety when used, albeit at a much younger age, by cisgender youth being treated for precocious puberty. Horton criticised the review for prioritizing high-quality evidence according to the GRADE approach, which designates randomized control trials (RCTs) as "high quality", since RCTs are widely considered infeasible and unethical for transgender youth if those in the control group are denied medical treatment. Horton also argued that it had not followed GRADE guidance which states that "low or very low quality evidence can lead to a strong recommendation" by not taking the low-quality studies into account when forming evidence review recommendations.

The Bell v Tavistock decision by the High Court of Justice for England and Wales ruled children under 16 were not competent to give informed consent to puberty blockers, but this was overturned by the Court of Appeal in September 2021.

In 2022, the British Medical Association opposed restrictions on puberty blockers, and the NHS restricted their use for children under 16 years of age to centrally administered clinical research.

The April 2024, Cass Review stated that there was inadequate evidence to justify the widespread use of puberty blockers for gender dysphoria, and that more research was needed to provide evidence as to the effectiveness of this treatment, in terms of reducing distress and improving psychological functioning. This led to a de facto moratorium of the routine provision of puberty blockers for gender dysphoria within NHS England and NHS Scotland outside of clinical trials, and a subsequent ban on private prescription of puberty blockers in the United Kingdom.

Children already receiving puberty blockers via NHS England will be able to continue their treatment. In England, a clinical trial into puberty blockers is planned for early 2025.

In July 2024, the Royal College of General Practitioners stated that for patients under 18, no general practitioner should prescribe puberty blockers outside of a clinical trial, and the prescription of gender-affirming hormones should be left to specialists. They affirmed they will fully implement the Cass Review recommendations.

===== Bans in the United Kingdom =====
The United Kingdom has seen a rise of misinformation related to transgender health care being advanced by anti-transgender groups as part of a wider anti-transgender movement in the United Kingdom. The Lemkin Institute for Genocide Prevention issued a red-flag alerts for the UK in April 2025 due to the regression of rights of transgender individuals, including a ban on puberty blockers.

In December 2024, the Northern Ireland Executive announced a permanent ban on puberty blockers for under-18s, with the Executive's Deputy First Minister, Emma Little-Pengelly, saying it was "the right approach, informed by medical and scientific advice. The protection and safety of our young people must be paramount." The following day, the Health Secretary, Wes Streeting, announced in the House of Commons that the previously enacted ban on puberty blockers in England would be made indefinite and would be reviewed in 2027.

In June 2026, in the midst of a pressure campaign by some politicians calling for the proposed clinical trial into puberty blockers to be scrapped, Cass said in an interview with BBC that she believes that since her review was published, the risks about puberty blockers had been "exaggerated" and that "we genuinely don't know if there are harms" and that a clinical trial was "essential" to figure out "whether these drugs are helpful or not".

==== United States ====
Since 1993 the US Food and Drug Administration (FDA) has supported the use of puberty blockers to treat precocious puberty. Currently under FDA regulation the use of puberty blockers is considered on-label for the treatment of central precocious puberty.

For years, the FDA, Endocrine Society, American Academy of Pediatrics (AAP) and many other pediatric associations have supported the use of Gonadotropin-releasing hormone analogs (GnRHas) in central precocious puberty (CPP). Access to treatment depends on the classification of precocious puberty as well as other guidelines implemented by the Endocrine Society. To determine if a patient is experiencing precocious puberty and should receive treatment, a physical exam, blood test, and x-rays are required.

In 2009, the Lawson Wilkins Pediatric Endocrine Society and European Society for Pediatric Endocrinology published a consensus statement highlighting the effectiveness of Gonadotropin-releasing hormone analogs (GnRHas) in early onset central precocious puberty. They confirmed that the use of Gonadotropin-releasing hormone analogs (GnRHas) has had a positive effect on increasing adult height. However these Endocrine Societies believe additional research should be conducted before routinely suggesting GnRHAs for other conditions. There is still some uncertainty surrounding the effectiveness of GnRHas when utilized for other conditions.

Currently under FDA regulation, the use of puberty blockers in pediatrics with gender dysphoria is considered off-label.

The use of puberty blockers in youth experiencing gender dysphoria has been supported by the following organizations:

- The American Medical Association
- The American Psychological Association
- The American Academy of Pediatrics
- The American Academy of Child and Adolescent Psychiatry (AACAP)
- The American Psychiatric Association
- The Endocrine Society
- The Pediatric Endocrine Society
- The American Association of Clinical Endocrinologists
- The American College of Obstetricians and Gynecologists
- The American College of Physicians

There has been an increase in youth requesting treatment for gender affirming medical care. The increased medical coverage and societal awareness of transgender youth may be shifting accessibility to care.

===== Second Trump presidency (2025–present) =====
Following a January 2025 executive order, United States Department of Health and Human Services (HHS) issued a declaration in December 2025 stating that gender‑affirming care for minors, including puberty blockers, is "neither safe nor effective" and does not meet recognized standards of care, and it announced steps to eliminate such care for individuals under 19 in federal programs. HHS guidance now promotes psychotherapy and psychosocial support instead of puberty blockers, hormones, or surgeries for pediatric gender dysphoria.

===== Bans in the United States =====
Misinformation spread by anti-trans groups related to puberty blockers has been used by several states in the U.S. to support the creation of bans on puberty blockers. The Southern Poverty Law Center is tracking anti-trans hate groups involved in the spread of misinformation around the use of puberty blockers, and has highlighted several organizations, such as Genspect and the Society for Evidence-Based Gender Medicine (SEGM), who are principal actors involved in these efforts and members of the groups are heavily interlinked within the U.S. and with related groups in the UK and other countries, producing pseudo-scientific papers to support their opposition to gender-affirming care.

In April 2021, Arkansas passed a ban on treatment of minors under 18 with puberty blockers, but it was temporarily blocked by a federal judge a week before the law was set to take effect. In April 2022, Alabama passed a ban on minors under 19 from obtaining puberty blockers and made it a felony for a doctor to prescribe puberty blockers to a minor with a punishment of up to ten years in prison. The Alabama law was partially blocked by a federal judge a few days after the law took effect. In August 2022, Florida banned Medicaid from covering gender-affirming care, including puberty blockers. Medical experts criticized the report for citing pseudo-scientific sources and repeatedly dismissing legitimate medical studies as "low quality", which they said showed a flawed understanding of statistics, medical regulation, and scientific research.

As of July 2024, 26 states have enacted some form of ban on gender-affirming care for minors, but not all of these ban puberty blockers. Currently, only 18 of the 26 states have complete bans which are fully in effect. Six states have only partial bans and two are currently blocked from taking effect. While some states have banned all forms of medical transition, others have banned only specific types such as surgery. Six states have exceptions which allow minors who were already receiving gender-affirming care prior to the ban to continue their treatments. Currently, all 26 states make exceptions for puberty blockers, hormones and surgery for cisgender and intersex children. Only one state, West Virginia, makes exceptions in cases of "severe dysphoria". There is also currently only one state, Missouri, that has a ban which is set to expire after a certain period of time. Nearly all states with restrictions include specific provisions with penalties for providers and 4 states include provisions directed at parents or guardians. An additional 4 states include laws/policies that impact school officials such as teachers and counselors, among others.

In response to these bans, many Democrat-controlled states have gone in the opposite direction and enacted laws protecting access to gender-affirming care for minors and adults. These laws, often called "shield" laws, often explicitly combine protections for gender-affirming care and abortion and cover a variety of protections including protecting both providers and patients from being punished, mandating insurance providers to cover the procedures and acting as "sanctuary states" that protect patients traveling to the state from other states that have banned such treatments among other things. As of June 2024, 16 states and the District of Columbia have enacted "shield" laws.

Some US state bans on gender-affirming care including puberty blockers have been declared unconstitutional. Furthermore, bans on puberty blockers have been criticized as governments interfering with the patient-doctor relationship and taking away healthcare decisions from parents and families for their children. State level bans on gender-affirming care, including puberty blockers, in the United States have led some families with transgender children to move out of their states.

In June 2025, the United States Supreme Court upheld a Tennessee law banning hormone treatments and puberty blockers for transgender minors. In United States v. Skrmetti, the Supreme Court ruled 6-3 that the law does not violate the equal protection clause of the 14th Amendment.
