= JV-1-36 =

Names
- IUPAC name N-(2-Phenylacetyl)-L-tyrosyl-D-arginyl-L-α-aspartyl-L-alanyl-L-isoleucyl-4-chloro-L-phenylalanyl-L-threonyl-L-asparaginyl-N6-(aminoiminomethyl)-L-lysyl-O-methyl-L-tyrosyl-L-arginyl-L-lysyl-L-valyl-L-leucyl-(2S)-2-aminobutanoyl-L-glutaminyl-L-leucyl-L-seryl-L-alanyl-L-arginyl-L-lysyl-L-leucyl-L-leucyl-L-glutaminyl-L-α-aspartyl-L-isoleucyl-L-norleucyl-D-arginyl-N6-(aminoiminomethyl)-L-lysinamide
- Other names Phenylacetyl-(D-Arg^{2}·^{28},p-chloro-Phe^{6},Homoarg^{9}·^{29},Tyr(Me)^{10},Abu^{15},Nle^{27})-Sermorelin

Identifiers
CAS Number	221377-79-3
3D model (JSmol)	Interactive image
IUPHAR/BPS	1107
- InChI: InChI=1S/C172H284ClN53O41/c1-21-25-43-107(143(243)206-112(49-38-73-195-170(186)187)142(242)202-106(138(179)238)44-31-35-70-192-167(180)181)212-164(264)136(94(16)23-3)225-161(261)126(86-133(236)237)218-150(250)116(65-67-129(177)231)211-154(254)117(76-88(5)6)215-155(255)118(77-89(7)8)213-146(246)108(45-29-33-68-174)204-144(244)111(48-37-72-194-169(184)185)203-139(239)95(17)199-162(262)127(87-227)222-156(256)119(78-90(9)10)214-149(249)115(64-66-128(176)230)210-141(241)105(24-4)201-153(253)120(79-91(11)12)219-163(263)134(92(13)14)223-151(251)110(46-30-34-69-175)205-145(245)113(50-39-74-196-171(188)189)209-158(258)122(82-101-56-62-104(267-20)63-57-101)216-147(247)109(47-32-36-71-193-168(182)183)207-159(259)124(84-130(178)232)221-166(266)137(97(19)228)226-160(260)123(81-99-52-58-102(173)59-53-99)220-165(265)135(93(15)22-2)224-140(240)96(18)198-152(252)125(85-132(234)235)217-148(248)114(51-40-75-197-172(190)191)208-157(257)121(80-100-54-60-103(229)61-55-100)200-131(233)83-98-41-27-26-28-42-98/h26-28,41-42,52-63,88-97,105-127,134-137,227-229H,21-25,29-40,43-51,64-87,174-175H2,1-20H3,(H2,176,230)(H2,177,231)(H2,178,232)(H2,179,238)(H,198,252)(H,199,262)(H,200,233)(H,201,253)(H,202,242)(H,203,239)(H,204,244)(H,205,245)(H,206,243)(H,207,259)(H,208,257)(H,209,258)(H,210,241)(H,211,254)(H,212,264)(H,213,246)(H,214,249)(H,215,255)(H,216,247)(H,217,248)(H,218,250)(H,219,263)(H,220,265)(H,221,266)(H,222,256)(H,223,251)(H,224,240)(H,225,261)(H,226,260)(H,234,235)(H,236,237)(H4,180,181,192)(H4,182,183,193)(H4,184,185,194)(H4,186,187,195)(H4,188,189,196)(H4,190,191,197)/t93-,94-,95-,96-,97+,105-,106-,107-,108-,109-,110-,111-,112+,113-,114+,115-,116-,117-,118-,119-,120-,121-,122-,123-,124-,125-,126-,127-,134-,135-,136-,137-/m0/s1 Key: GQQSWGAXAPMZAE-OHOGIUKSSA-N
- SMILES: N=C(NCCC[C@@H](NC([C@@H](NC(CC1=CC=CC=C1)=O)CC2=CC=C(C=C2)O)=O)C(N[C@H](C(N[C@H](C(N[C@H](C(N[C@H](C(N[C@H](C(N[C@H](C(N[C@H](C(N[C@H](C(N[C@H](C(N[C@H](C(N[C@H](C(N[C@H](C(N[C@H](C(N[C@H](C(N[C@H](C(N[C@H](C(N[C@H](C(N[C@H](C(N[C@H](C(N[C@H](C(N[C@H](C(N[C@H](C(N[C@H](C(N[C@H](C(N[C@H](C(N[C@@H](C(N[C@H](C(N)=O)CCCCNC(N)=N)=O)CCCNC(N)=N)=O)CCCC)=O)[C@H](CC)C)=O)CC(O)=O)=O)CCC(N)=O)=O)CC(C)C)=O)CC(C)C)=O)CCCCN)=O)CCCNC(N)=N)=O)C)=O)CO)=O)CC(C)C)=O)CCC(N)=O)=O)CC)=O)CC(C)C)=O)C(C)C)=O)CCCCN)=O)CCCNC(N)=N)=O)CC3=CC=C(OC)C=C3)=O)CCCCNC(N)=N)=O)CC(N)=O)=O)[C@@H](C)O)=O)CC4=CC=C(Cl)C=C4)=O)[C@H](CC)C)=O)C)=O)CC(O)=O)=O)N

Properties
Chemical formula	C_{172}H_{284}ClN_{53}O_{41}
Molar mass	3785.94 g·mol^{−1}
- Except where otherwise noted, data are given for materials in their standard state (at 25 °C [77 °F], 100 kPa). Infobox references

JV-1-36 is a GHRH antagonist that has been shown to inhibit endometriotic cell proliferation and survival, suggesting that GHRH antagonist may represent promising tools for treatment of endometriosis.
