= Abarelix =

Chemical compound

Clinical data
- Trade names: Plenaxis
- AHFS/Drugs.com: Monograph
- Routes of administration: Intramuscular injection
- Drug class: GnRH analogue; GnRH antagonist; Antigonadotropin
- ATC code: L02BX01 (WHO)

Pharmacokinetic data
- Protein binding: 96–99%

Identifiers
- IUPAC name: N-Acetyl-3-(2-naphthyl)-D-alanyl-4-chloro-D-phenylalanyl-3-(3-pyridyl)-D-alanyl-L-seryl-N-methyl-L-tyrosyl-D-asparagyl-L-leucyl-N6-isopropyl-L-lysyl-L-prolyl-D-alaninamide
- CAS Number: 183552-38-7
- PubChem CID: 16131215
- IUPHAR/BPS: 1188
- DrugBank: DB00106
- ChemSpider: 10482301
- UNII: W486SJ5824
- KEGG: D02738
- ChEBI: CHEBI:337298
- ChEMBL: ChEMBL1252
- CompTox Dashboard (EPA): DTXSID20171443

Chemical and physical data
- Formula: C_{72}H_{95}ClN_{14}O_{14}
- Molar mass: 1416.09 g·mol^{−1}
- 3D model (JSmol): Interactive image
- SMILES: CC(C)C[C@H](NC(=O)[C@@H](CC(N)=O)NC(=O)[C@H](Cc1ccc(O)cc1)N(C)C(=O)[C@H](CO)NC(=O)[C@@H](Cc2cccnc2)NC(=O)[C@@H](Cc3ccc(Cl)cc3)NC(=O)[C@@H](NCc5ccc4ccccc4c5)NC(C)=O)C(=O)N[C@@H](CCCCNC(C)C)C(=O)N6CCC[C@H]6C(=O)N[C@H](C)C(N)=O
- InChI: InChI=1S/C72H95ClN14O14/c1-41(2)32-54(64(93)80-53(17-10-11-30-77-42(3)4)72(101)87-31-13-18-60(87)69(98)78-43(5)63(75)92)81-68(97)58(38-62(74)91)84-70(99)61(37-46-22-27-52(90)28-23-46)86(7)71(100)59(40-88)85-67(96)57(36-48-14-12-29-76-39-48)83-66(95)56(34-45-20-25-51(73)26-21-45)82-65(94)55(79-44(6)89)35-47-19-24-49-15-8-9-16-50(49)33-47/h8-9,12,14-16,19-29,33,39,41-43,53-61,77,88,90H,10-11,13,17-18,30-32,34-38,40H2,1-7H3,(H2,74,91)(H2,75,92)(H,78,98)(H,79,89)(H,80,93)(H,81,97)(H,82,94)(H,83,95)(H,84,99)(H,85,96)/t43-,53+,54+,55-,56-,57-,58-,59+,60+,61+/m1/s1; Key:AIWRTTMUVOZGPW-HSPKUQOVSA-N

Abarelix, sold under the brand name Plenaxis, is an injectable gonadotropin-releasing hormone antagonist (GnRH antagonist) which is marketed in Germany and the Netherlands. It is primarily used in oncology to reduce the amount of testosterone made in patients with advanced symptomatic prostate cancer for which no other treatment options are available.

It was originally marketed by Praecis Pharmaceuticals as Plenaxis, and is now marketed by Speciality European Pharma in Germany after receiving a marketing authorization in 2005. The drug was introduced in the United States in 2003, but was discontinued in this country in May 2005 due to poor sales and a higher-than-expected incidence of severe allergic reactions. It remains marketed in Germany and the Netherlands however.

== See also ==
- Gonadotropin-releasing hormone receptor § Antagonists
