= Ozarelix =

Chemical compound

Clinical data
- Other names: D-63153; SPI-153
- Routes of administration: Injection
- Drug class: GnRH modulator; GnRH antagonist; Antigonadotropin

Identifiers
- IUPAC name: (2S)-1-[(2S)-2-[[(2S)-2-[[(2R)-2-[[(2S)-2-[[(2S)-2-[[(2R)-2-[[(2R)-2-[[(2R)-2-Acetamido-3-naphthalen-2-ylpropanoyl]amino]-3-(4-chlorophenyl)propanoyl]amino]-3-pyridin-3-ylpropanoyl]amino]-3-hydroxypropanoyl]-methylamino]-3-(4-hydroxyphenyl)propanoyl]amino]-6-(carbamoylamino)hexanoyl]amino]hexanoyl]amino]-5-(diaminomethylideneamino)pentanoyl]-N-[(2R)-1-amino-1-oxopropan-2-yl]pyrrolidine-2-carboxamide
- CAS Number: 295350-45-7 896710-46-6 (acetate)
- PubChem CID: 25080293
- DrugBank: DB12581
- ChemSpider: 17291594
- UNII: Q1IF8M2YL3
- CompTox Dashboard (EPA): DTXSID60183722
- ECHA InfoCard: 100.232.650

Chemical and physical data
- Formula: C_{72}H_{96}ClN_{17}O_{14}
- Molar mass: 1459.12 g·mol^{−1}
- 3D model (JSmol): Interactive image
- SMILES: CCCC[C@@H](C(=O)N[C@@H](CCCN=C(N)N)C(=O)N1CCC[C@H]1C(=O)N[C@H](C)C(=O)N)NC(=O)[C@@H](CCCCNC(=O)N)NC(=O)[C@H](CC2=CC=C(C=C2)O)N(C)C(=O)[C@H](CO)NC(=O)[C@@H](CC3=CN=CC=C3)NC(=O)[C@@H](CC4=CC=C(C=C4)Cl)NC(=O)[C@@H](CC5=CC6=CC=CC=C6C=C5)NC(=O)C
- InChI: InChI=1S/C72H96ClN17O14/c1-5-6-17-52(63(96)85-54(19-12-33-79-71(75)76)70(103)90-34-13-20-59(90)67(100)81-42(2)61(74)94)83-62(95)53(18-9-10-32-80-72(77)104)84-68(101)60(39-45-24-29-51(93)30-25-45)89(4)69(102)58(41-91)88-66(99)57(38-47-14-11-31-78-40-47)87-65(98)56(36-44-22-27-50(73)28-23-44)86-64(97)55(82-43(3)92)37-46-21-26-48-15-7-8-16-49(48)35-46/h7-8,11,14-16,21-31,35,40,42,52-60,91,93H,5-6,9-10,12-13,17-20,32-34,36-39,41H2,1-4H3,(H2,74,94)(H,81,100)(H,82,92)(H,83,95)(H,84,101)(H,85,96)(H,86,97)(H,87,98)(H,88,99)(H4,75,76,79)(H3,77,80,104)/t42-,52+,53-,54+,55-,56-,57-,58+,59+,60+/m1/s1; Key:KATZUZNTRINHDT-HALMFYTRSA-N

Ozarelix (developmental code names D-63153, SPI-153) is a peptide gonadotropin-releasing hormone antagonist (GnRH antagonist) which is or was under development by AEterna Zentaris Inc. and Spectrum Pharmaceuticals as a long-acting injection formulation for the treatment of prostate cancer. It has also been investigated for the treatment of endometriosis, but no development has been reported. The drug was previously under investigation for the treatment of benign prostatic hyperplasia and Alzheimer's disease as well, but development for these indications was discontinued. As of June 2015, it was in phase II clinical trials for prostate cancer. It seems to no longer be under development.

== See also ==
- Gonadotropin-releasing hormone receptor § Antagonists
