= Acyline =

Chemical compound

Clinical data
- Other names: MER-104
- Routes of administration: Subcutaneous injection
- Drug class: GnRH antagonist

Identifiers
- IUPAC name: (2S)-1-[(2S)-2-[[(2S)-2-[[(2R)-2-[[(2S)-2-[[(2S)-2-[[(2R)-2-[[(2R)-2-[[(2R)-2-acetamido-3-naphthalen-2-ylpropanoyl]amino]-3-(4-chlorophenyl)propanoyl]amino]-3-pyridin-3-ylpropanoyl]amino]-3-hydroxypropanoyl]amino]-3-(4-acetamidophenyl)propanoyl]amino]-3-(4-acetamidophenyl)propanoyl]amino]-4-methylpentanoyl]amino]-6-(propan-2-ylamino)hexanoyl]-N-[(2R)-1-amino-1-oxopropan-2-yl]pyrrolidine-2-carboxamide
- CAS Number: 170157-13-8
- PubChem CID: 16137348
- DrugBank: DB11906
- ChemSpider: 17293858
- UNII: S3439D3B35
- ChEMBL: ChEMBL262747
- CompTox Dashboard (EPA): DTXSID60168812

Chemical and physical data
- Formula: C_{80}H_{102}ClN_{15}O_{14}
- Molar mass: 1533.24 g·mol^{−1}
- 3D model (JSmol): Interactive image
- SMILES: C[C@H](C(=O)N)NC(=O)[C@@H]1CCCN1C(=O)[C@H](CCCCNC(C)C)NC(=O)[C@H](CC(C)C)NC(=O)[C@@H](CC2=CC=C(C=C2)NC(=O)C)NC(=O)[C@H](CC3=CC=C(C=C3)NC(=O)C)NC(=O)[C@H](CO)NC(=O)[C@@H](CC4=CN=CC=C4)NC(=O)[C@@H](CC5=CC=C(C=C5)Cl)NC(=O)[C@@H](CC6=CC7=CC=CC=C7C=C6)NC(=O)C
- InChI: InChI=1S/C80H102ClN15O14/c1-46(2)37-63(72(102)89-62(18-11-12-35-84-47(3)4)80(110)96-36-14-19-70(96)79(109)85-48(5)71(82)101)90-74(104)66(40-53-23-30-60(31-24-53)86-49(6)98)92-76(106)67(41-54-25-32-61(33-26-54)87-50(7)99)94-78(108)69(45-97)95-77(107)68(43-56-15-13-34-83-44-56)93-75(105)65(39-52-21-28-59(81)29-22-52)91-73(103)64(88-51(8)100)42-55-20-27-57-16-9-10-17-58(57)38-55/h9-10,13,15-17,20-34,38,44,46-48,62-70,84,97H,11-12,14,18-19,35-37,39-43,45H2,1-8H3,(H2,82,101)(H,85,109)(H,86,98)(H,87,99)(H,88,100)(H,89,102)(H,90,104)(H,91,103)(H,92,106)(H,93,105)(H,94,108)(H,95,107)/t48-,62+,63+,64-,65-,66-,67+,68-,69+,70+/m1/s1; Key:ZWNUQDJANZGVFO-YHSALVGYSA-N

Acyline (developmental code name MER-104) is a gonadotropin-releasing hormone analogue (GnRH analogue) and gonadotropin-releasing hormone antagonist (GnRH antagonist) which was never marketed. It has been shown to suppress gonadotropin and testosterone levels in men. Acyline is a peptide and under normal circumstances is not orally active. For this reason, it has instead been administered by subcutaneous injection.

== See also ==
- Gonadotropin-releasing hormone receptor § Antagonists
