= Degarelix =

Chemical compound

Clinical data
- Trade names: Firmagon, others
- Other names: FE-200486
- AHFS/Drugs.com: Monograph
- MedlinePlus: a609022
- License data: EU EMA: by INN; US DailyMed: Degarelix; US FDA: Degarelix
- Pregnancy category: AU: D; Contraindicated
- Routes of administration: Subcutaneous injection
- Drug class: GnRH analogue; GnRH antagonist; Antigonadotropin
- ATC code: L02BX02 (WHO)

Legal status
- Legal status: AU: S4 (Prescription only); UK: POM (Prescription only); US: ℞-only; EU: Rx-only; In general: ℞ (Prescription only)

Pharmacokinetic data
- Bioavailability: 30–40%
- Protein binding: ~90%
- Metabolism: Subject to common peptidic degradation during passage through the hepato-biliary system; not a substrate for the human CYP450 system
- Elimination half-life: 23–61 days
- Excretion: Feces: 70–80% Urine: 20–30%

Identifiers
- CAS Number: 214766-78-6
- PubChem CID: 16136245
- IUPHAR/BPS: 5585
- DrugBank: DB06699
- ChemSpider: 17292756
- UNII: SX0XJI3A11
- KEGG: D08901; D09400
- ChEMBL: ChEMBL264089
- CompTox Dashboard (EPA): DTXSID801026401
- ECHA InfoCard: 100.234.843

Chemical and physical data
- Formula: C_{82}H_{103}ClN_{18}O_{16}
- Molar mass: 1632.29 g·mol^{−1}
- 3D model (JSmol): Interactive image
- SMILES: C[C@H](C(=O)N)NC(=O)[C@@H]1CCCN1C(=O)[C@H](CCCCNC(C)C)NC(=O)[C@H](CC(C)C)NC(=O)[C@@H](Cc2ccc(cc2)NC(=O)N)NC(=O)[C@H](Cc3ccc(cc3)NC(=O)[C@@H]4CC(=O)NC(=O)N4)NC(=O)[C@H](CO)NC(=O)[C@@H](Cc5cccnc5)NC(=O)[C@@H](Cc6ccc(cc6)Cl)NC(=O)[C@@H](Cc7ccc8ccccc8c7)NC(=O)C
- InChI: InChI=1S/C82H103ClN18O16/c1-45(2)35-60(72(107)92-59(16-9-10-33-87-46(3)4)80(115)101-34-12-17-68(101)79(114)88-47(5)70(84)105)93-74(109)63(38-51-23-30-58(31-24-51)91-81(85)116)95-76(111)64(39-50-21-28-57(29-22-50)90-71(106)66-42-69(104)100-82(117)99-66)97-78(113)67(44-102)98-77(112)65(41-53-13-11-32-86-43-53)96-75(110)62(37-49-19-26-56(83)27-20-49)94-73(108)61(89-48(6)103)40-52-18-25-54-14-7-8-15-55(54)36-52/h7-8,11,13-15,18-32,36,43,45-47,59-68,87,102H,9-10,12,16-17,33-35,37-42,44H2,1-6H3,(H2,84,105)(H,88,114)(H,89,103)(H,90,106)(H,92,107)(H,93,109)(H,94,108)(H,95,111)(H,96,110)(H,97,113)(H,98,112)(H3,85,91,116)(H2,99,100,104,117)/t47-,59+,60+,61-,62-,63-,64+,65-,66+,67+,68+/m1/s1; Key:MEUCPCLKGZSHTA-XYAYPHGZSA-N

Degarelix, sold under the brand name Firmagon among others, is a hormonal therapy used in the treatment of prostate cancer.

Testosterone is a male hormone that promotes growth of many prostate tumours and therefore reducing circulating testosterone to very low (castration) levels is often the treatment goal in the management of advanced prostate cancer. Degarelix has an immediate onset of action, binding to gonadotropin-releasing hormone (GnRH) receptors in the pituitary gland and blocking their interaction with GnRH. This induces a fast and profound reduction in luteinizing hormone (LH), follicle-stimulating hormone (FSH) and in turn, testosterone suppression.

== Medical uses ==
The GnRH antagonist degarelix, through its ability to reduce serum testosterone, is used to treat hormone-sensitive prostate cancer.

== Side effects ==
Degarelix is commonly associated with hormonal side effects such as hot flashes and weight gain. Due to its mode of administration (subcutaneous injection), degarelix is also associated with injection-site reactions such as injection-site pain, erythema or swelling. Injection-site reactions are usually mild or moderate in intensity and occur predominantly after the first dose, decreasing in frequency thereafter. Less common: Anemia. Diarrhea, nausea. Hyperhidrosis including night sweats, rash. Gynecomastia, testicular atrophy, erectile dysfunction. Increased transaminases. Musculoskeletal pain and discomfort. Dizziness, headache. Insomnia. Weight gain. Chills, fever, fatigue, flu-like illness.

== Pharmacology ==
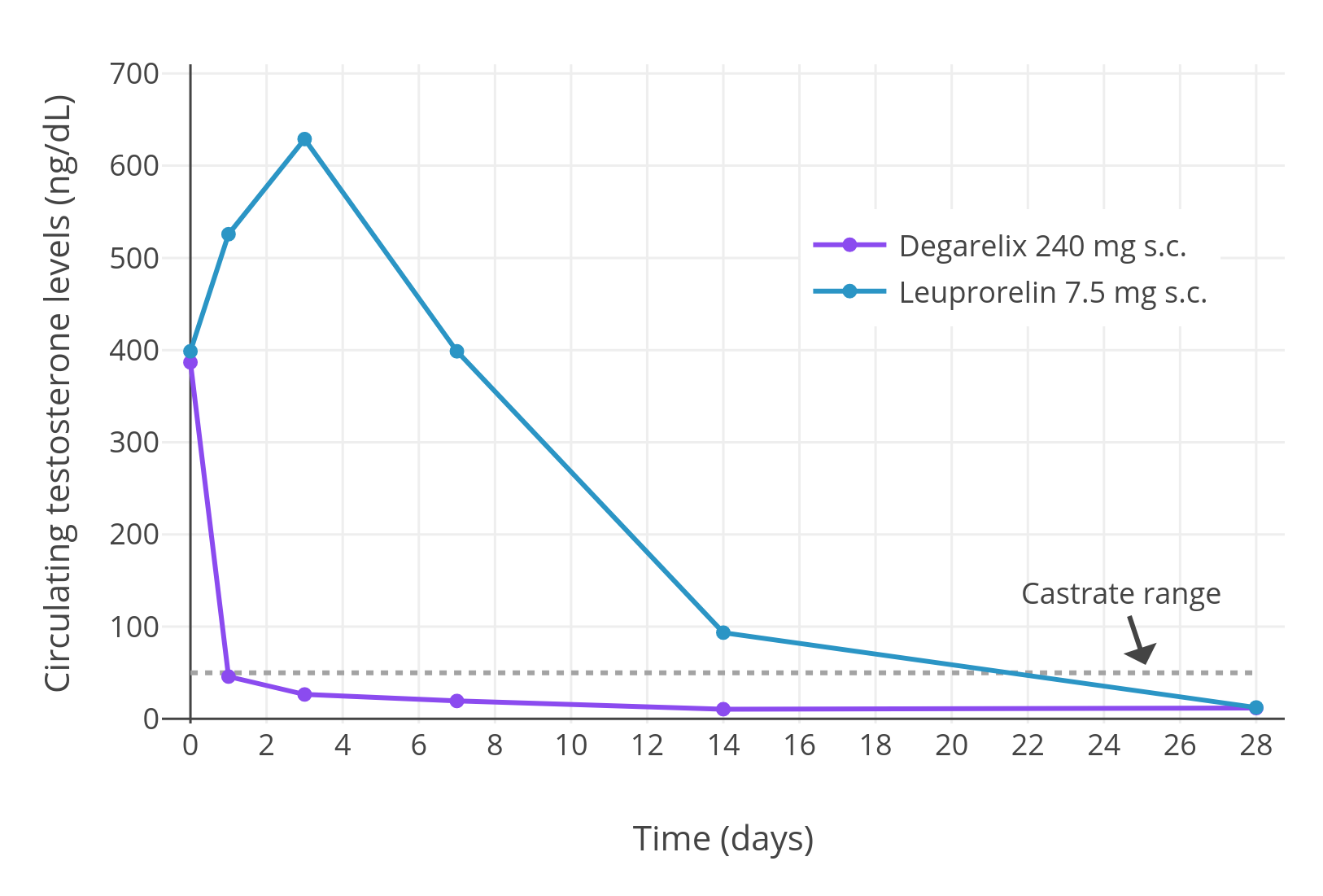
Testosterone levels during the first month of androgen deprivation therapy in men with prostate cancer treated with subcutaneous injections of the GnRH antagonist degarelix (240 then 80 mg/month or the GnRH agonist leuprorelin (7.5 mg/month).

GnRH antagonists (receptor blockers) such as degarelix are synthetic peptide derivatives of the natural GnRH decapeptide – a hormone that is made by neurons in the hypothalamus. GnRH antagonists compete with natural GnRH for binding to GnRH receptors in the pituitary gland. This reversible binding blocks the release of LH and FSH from the pituitary. The reduction in LH subsequently leads to a rapid and sustained suppression of testosterone release from the testes and subsequently reduces the size and growth of the prostate cancer. This in turn results in a reduction in prostate-specific antigen (PSA) levels in the patient's blood. Measuring PSA levels helps to monitor how patients with prostate cancer are responding to treatment.

Unlike GnRH agonists, which cause an initial stimulation of the hypothalamic-pituitary-gonadal axis (HPGA), leading to a surge in testosterone levels, and under certain circumstances, a flare-up of the tumour, GnRH antagonists do not cause a surge in testosterone or clinical flare. Clinical flare is a phenomenon that occurs in patients with advanced disease, which can precipitate a range of clinical symptoms such as bone pain, urethral obstruction, and spinal cord compression. Drug agencies have issued boxed warnings regarding this phenomenon in the prescribing information for GnRH agonists. As testosterone surge does not occur with GnRH antagonists, there is no need for patients to receive an antiandrogen as flare protection during prostate cancer treatment. GnRH agonists also induce an increase in testosterone levels after each reinjection of the drug – a phenomenon that does not occur with GnRH antagonists such as degarelix.

GnRH antagonists have an immediate onset of action leading to a fast and profound suppression of testosterone and are therefore especially valuable in the treatment of patients with prostate cancer where fast control of disease is needed.

== History ==
In December 2008, the US Food and Drug Administration (FDA) approved degarelix for the treatment of people with advanced prostate cancer. It was subsequently approved by the European Commission at the recommendation of the European Medicines Agency (EMA) in February 2009, for use in adult males with advanced, hormone-dependent prostate cancer. Ferring Pharmaceuticals markets the drug under the name Firmagon.

== Research ==
Degarelix is studied for use as a chemical castration agent on men with pedophilia in Sweden. A study demonstrated a reduced risk score for committing child sexual abuse in men with pedophilic disorder two weeks after initial injection.

== See also ==
- Gonadotropin-releasing hormone receptor § Antagonists
