= Opigolix =

Chemical compound

Clinical data
- Other names: ASP-1707
- Routes of administration: By mouth
- Drug class: GnRH modulator; GnRH antagonist; Antigonadotropin

Identifiers
- IUPAC name: (2R)-N'-[5-[3-(2,5-difluorophenyl)-2-(1,3-dihydrobenzimidazol-2-ylidene)-3-oxopropanoyl]-2-fluorophenyl]sulfonyl-2-hydroxypropanimidamide
- CAS Number: 912587-25-8
- PubChem CID: 11977994
- UNII: VQ6CK0CITA
- KEGG: D11351

Chemical and physical data
- Formula: C_{25}H_{19}F_{3}N_{4}O_{5}S
- Molar mass: 544.51 g·mol^{−1}
- 3D model (JSmol): Interactive image
- SMILES: C[C@@H](O)/C(N)=N/S(=O)(=O)c1cc(C(=O)C(C(=O)c2cc(F)ccc2F)=C2Nc3ccccc3N2)ccc1F
- InChI: InChI=1S/C25H19F3N4O5S/c1-12(33)24(29)32-38(36,37)20-10-13(6-8-17(20)28)22(34)21(23(35)15-11-14(26)7-9-16(15)27)25-30-18-4-2-3-5-19(18)31-25/h2-12,30-31,33H,1H3,(H2,29,32)/t12-/m1/s1; Key:CWNLBPBIFALUQD-GFCCVEGCSA-N

Opigolix (INN, USAN; developmental code name ASP-1707) is a small-molecule, non-peptide, orally active gonadotropin-releasing hormone antagonist (GnRH antagonist) which was under development by Astellas Pharma for the treatment of endometriosis and rheumatoid arthritis. It was also under investigation for the treatment of prostate cancer. It reached phase II clinical trials for both endometriosis and rheumatoid arthritis prior to the discontinuation of its development in April 2018.

== See also ==
- Gonadotropin-releasing hormone receptor § Antagonists
