= Ganirelix =

Pharmaceutical drug

Clinical data
- Trade names: Orgalutran, Antagon, others
- AHFS/Drugs.com: Monograph
- License data: US DailyMed: Ganirelix
- Pregnancy category: AU: D
- Routes of administration: Subcutaneous injection
- Drug class: GnRH analogue; GnRH antagonist; Antigonadotropin
- ATC code: H01CC01 (WHO)

Legal status
- Legal status: AU: S4 (Prescription only); CA: ℞-only; US: ℞-only; EU: Rx-only

Pharmacokinetic data
- Bioavailability: 91.1%
- Protein binding: 81.9%
- Elimination half-life: 16.2 hours
- Excretion: Feces: 75% Urine: 22%

Identifiers
- IUPAC name: (2S)-1-[(2S)-2-[[(2S)-2-[[(2R)-2-[[(2R)-2-[[(2S)-2-[[(2R)-2-[[(2R)-2-[[(2R)-2-acetamido-3-naphthalen-2-ylpropanoyl]amino]-3-(4-chlorophenyl)propanoyl]amino]-3-pyridin-3-ylpropanoyl]amino]-3-hydroxypropanoyl]amino]-3-(4-hydroxyphenyl)propanoyl]amino]-6-[bis(ethylamino)methylideneamino]hexanoyl]amino]-4-methylpentanoyl]amino]-6-[bis(ethylamino)methylideneamino]hexanoyl]-N-[(2R)-1-amino-1-oxopropan-2-yl]pyrrolidine-2-carboxamide
- CAS Number: 124904-93-4
- PubChem CID: 16186319
- IUPHAR/BPS: 3877
- DrugBank: DB06785
- ChemSpider: 16736620
- UNII: IX503L9WN0
- KEGG: D08010; as salt: D04302
- ChEMBL: ChEMBL1251
- CompTox Dashboard (EPA): DTXSID401027283
- ECHA InfoCard: 100.216.077

Chemical and physical data
- Formula: C_{80}H_{113}ClN_{18}O_{13}
- Molar mass: 1570.35 g·mol^{−1}
- 3D model (JSmol): Interactive image
- SMILES: CCNC(=NCCCC[C@H](NC(=O)[C@H](CC(C)C)NC(=O)[C@@H](CCCCN=C(NCC)NCC)NC(=O)[C@H](Cc1ccc(O)cc1)NC(=O)[C@H](CO)NC(=O)[C@@H](Cc1cccnc1)NC(=O)[C@@H](Cc1ccc(Cl)cc1)NC(=O)[C@@H](Cc1ccc2ccccc2c1)NC(C)=O)C(=O)N1CCC[C@H]1C(=O)N[C@H](C)C(N)=O)NCC
- InChI: InChI=1S/C80H113ClN18O13/c1-9-84-79(85-10-2)88-38-17-15-24-60(70(104)94-62(41-49(5)6)71(105)93-61(25-16-18-39-89-80(86-11-3)87-12-4)78(112)99-40-20-26-68(99)77(111)90-50(7)69(82)103)92-73(107)64(44-53-30-35-59(102)36-31-53)97-76(110)67(48-100)98-75(109)66(46-55-21-19-37-83-47-55)96-74(108)65(43-52-28-33-58(81)34-29-52)95-72(106)63(91-51(8)101)45-54-27-32-56-22-13-14-23-57(56)42-54/h13-14,19,21-23,27-37,42,47,49-50,60-68,100,102H,9-12,15-18,20,24-26,38-41,43-46,48H2,1-8H3,(H2,82,103)(H,90,111)(H,91,101)(H,92,107)(H,93,105)(H,94,104)(H,95,106)(H,96,108)(H,97,110)(H,98,109)(H2,84,85,88)(H2,86,87,89)/t50-,60-,61+,62+,63-,64+,65-,66-,67+,68+/m1/s1; Key:GJNXBNATEDXMAK-PFLSVRRQSA-N

Ganirelix acetate (or diacetate), sold under the brand names Orgalutran and Antagon among others, is an injectable competitive gonadotropin-releasing hormone antagonist (GnRH antagonist). It is primarily used in assisted reproduction to control ovulation. The drug works by blocking the action of gonadotropin-releasing hormone (GnRH) upon the pituitary, thus rapidly suppressing the production and action of LH and FSH. Ganirelix is used in fertility treatment to prevent premature ovulation that could result in the harvesting of eggs that are too immature to be used in procedures such as in vitro fertilization.

GnRH agonists are also sometimes used in reproductive therapy, as well as to treat disorders involving sex-steroid hormones, such as endometriosis. One advantage of using GnRH antagonists is that repeated administration of GnRH agonists results in decreased levels of gonadotropins and sex steroids due to desensitization of the pituitary. This is avoided when using GnRH antagonists such as ganirelix. The success of ganirelix in reproductive therapy has been shown to be comparable to that when using GnRH agonists.

== Medical uses ==
Ganirelix is used as a fertility treatment drug for women. Specifically, it is used to prevent premature ovulation in people with ovaries undergoing fertility treatment involving ovarian hyperstimulation that causes the ovaries to produce multiple eggs. When such premature ovulation occurs, the eggs released by the ovaries may be too immature to be used in in-vitro fertilization. Ganirelix prevents ovulation until it is triggered by injecting human chorionic gonadotrophin (hCG).

== Contraindications ==
Ganirelix should not be used in women who are already pregnant, and because of this the onset of pregnancy must be ruled out before it is administered. Women using ganirelix should not breastfeed, as it is not known whether ganirelix is excreted in breast milk.

== Side effects ==
Clinical studies have shown that the most common side effect is a slight reaction at the site of injection in the form of redness, and sometimes swelling. Clinical studies have shown that, one hour after injection, the incidence of at least one moderate or severe local skin reaction per treatment cycle was 12% in 4 patients treated with ganirelix and 25% in patients treated subcutaneously with a GnRH agonist. The local reactions generally disappear within 4 hours after administration. Other reported side effects are some that are known to be associated with ovarian hyperstimulation, including gynecological abdominal pain, headache, vaginal bleeding, nausea, and gastrointestinal abdominal pain. In some rare cases, less than 1 user in 10,000, hypersensitivity to ganirelix can cause anaphylactoid reactions, most likely due to allergy.

=== Birth defects ===
A follow-up analysis for ganirelix done by the Marketing Authorisation Holder compared the number of congenital malformations between individuals whose mothers were treated with ganirelix compared with individuals whose mothers were treated with a GnRH agonist. The total number of congenital malformations was higher in the ganirelix group than in the GnRH agonist group (7.6% vs. 5.5%). This falls within the range for the normal incidence of congenital malformations, and current data do not suggest that ganirelix increases the incidence of congenital malformations or anomalies. No important differences in the frequency of ectopic pregnancies and miscarriage were noted with the use of ganirelix.

== Pharmacology ==
=== Pharmacodynamics ===
Ganirelix is a synthetic peptide that works as an antagonist against gonadotropin-releasing hormone (GnRH) ("Ganirelix acetate injection," 2009). Ganirelix competitively blocks GnRH receptors on the pituitary gonadotroph, quickly resulting in the suppression of gonadotropin secretion. This suppression is easily reversed by discontinuation of ganirelix administration. Ganirelix has a significantly higher receptor binding affinity (Kd = 0.4 nM) than GnRH (Kd = 3.6 nM).

=== Pharmacokinetics ===
When ganirelix is given to healthy adult females, steady-state serum concentrations are reached, on average, after three days ("Ganirelix acetate injection," 2009). A study administering ganirelix to healthy adult females (n=15) found the mean (SD) elimination half-life (t1/2) to be 16.2(1.6) hours, volume of distribution/absolute bioavailability (Vd/F) 76.5(10.3) liters, maximum serum concentration (Cmax) 11.2(2.4) ng/mL, and the time until maximum concentration (tmax) 1.1(0.2) hours. One 250 μg injection of ganirelix resulted in a mean absolute bioavailability of 91.1%.

== Chemistry ==
Ganirelix is derived from GnRH, with amino acid substitutions made at positions 1, 2, 3, 6, 8, and 10.

== History ==
The European Commission gave marketing authorization for ganirelix throughout the European Union to N.V. Organon in May 2000.
