= Linzagolix =

Chemical compound

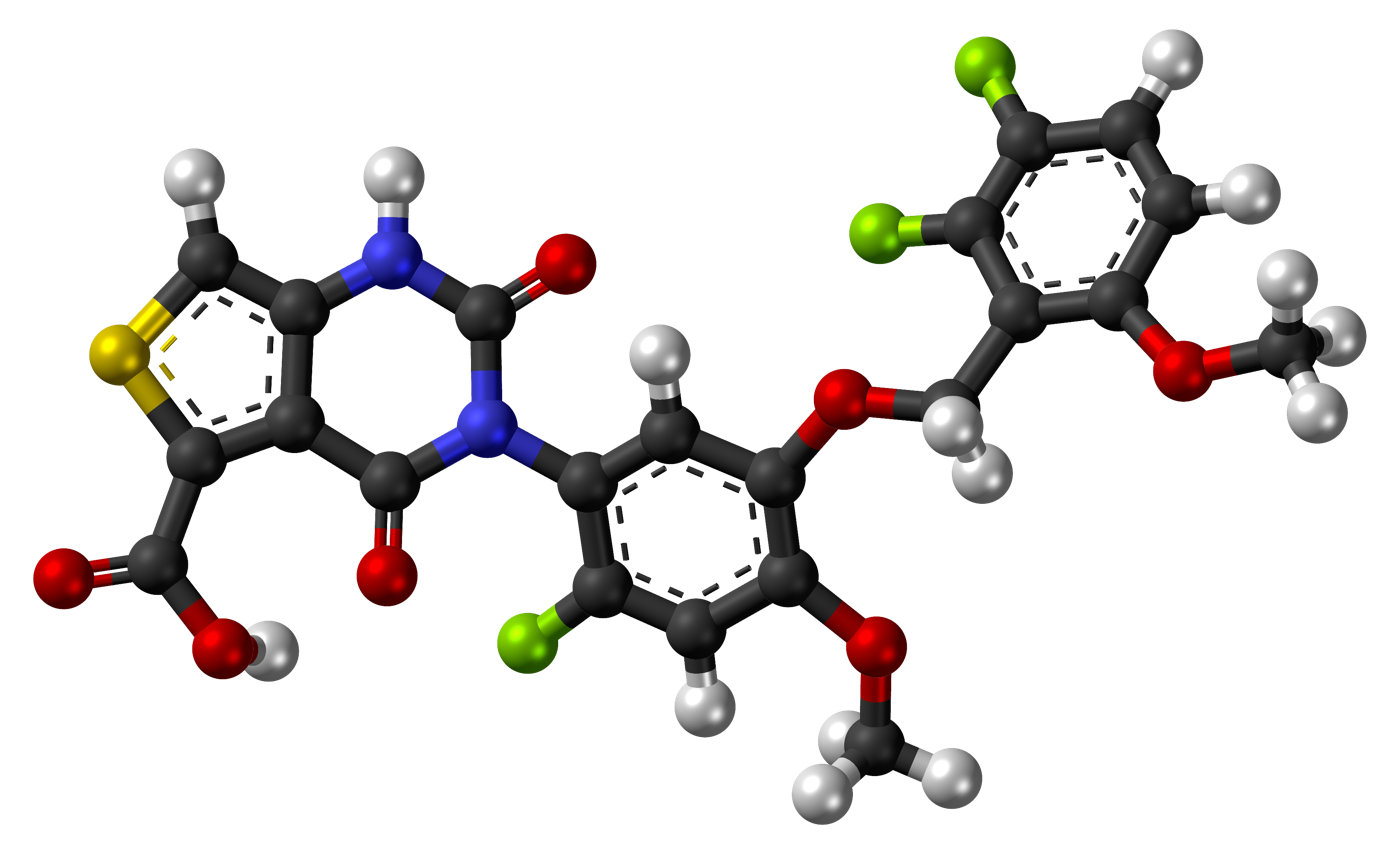

Clinical data
- Pronunciation: /ˌlɪnzəˈɡoʊlɪks/ LINZ-ə-GOH-liks
- Trade names: Yselty
- Other names: KLH-2109; OBE-2109
- Routes of administration: By mouth
- Drug class: GnRH modulator; GnRH antagonist; Antigonadotropin
- ATC code: H01CC04 (WHO)

Legal status
- Legal status: AU: S4 (Prescription only); UK: POM (Prescription only); EU: Rx-only

Identifiers
- IUPAC name: 3-{5-[(2,3-difluoro-6-methoxyphenyl)methoxy]-2-fluoro-4-methoxyphenyl}-2,4-dioxo-1,2,3,4-tetrahydrothieno[3,4-d]pyrimidine-5-carboxylic acid
- CAS Number: 935283-04-8; as choline: 1321816-57-2
- PubChem CID: 16656889
- ChemSpider: 17590169
- UNII: 7CDW97HUEX
- KEGG: D11608; as choline: D11609
- ChEMBL: ChEMBL3668014; as choline: ChEMBL4298171

Chemical and physical data
- Formula: C_{22}H_{15}F_{3}N_{2}O_{7}S
- Molar mass: 508.42 g·mol^{−1}
- 3D model (JSmol): Interactive image
- SMILES: COc1cc(F)c(-n2c(=O)[nH]c3csc(C(=O)O)c3c2=O)cc1OCc1c(OC)ccc(F)c1F
- InChI: InChI=1S/C22H15F3N2O7S/c1-32-14-4-3-10(23)18(25)9(14)7-34-16-6-13(11(24)5-15(16)33-2)27-20(28)17-12(26-22(27)31)8-35-19(17)21(29)30/h3-6,8H,7H2,1-2H3,(H,26,31)(H,29,30); Key:BMAAMIIYNNPHAB-UHFFFAOYSA-N

Linzagolix, sold under the brand name Yselty, is a medication used in the treatment of uterine fibroids and endometriosis. Linzagolix is a small-molecule, non-peptide, orally active gonadotropin-releasing hormone antagonist (GnRH antagonist) developed by Kissei Pharmaceutical and ObsEva.

In June 2022, it was approved for medical use in the European Union and in the United Kingdom.

== Medical uses ==
Linzagolix is indicated for treatment of moderate to severe symptoms of uterine fibroids in adult women of reproductive age and for treatment of intractable endometriosis.

=== Available forms ===
Linzagolix is available as linzagolix choline, the choline salt of linzagolix, in the form of 100 and 200 mg film-coated oral tablets.

== Pharmacology ==
=== Pharmacodynamics ===
Linzagolix acts as a selective antagonist of the GnRH receptor, the biological target of GnRH. By blocking this receptor, linzagolix prevents GnRH-mediated secretion of the gonadotropins, luteinizing hormone (LH) and follicle-stimulating hormone (FSH), and prevents them from signaling the gonads to produce sex hormones including estrogens, progesterone, and androgens.

In clinical studies, linzagolix fully suppressed estradiol levels (median <20 pg/mL) in women at a dosage of 200 mg/day, whereas partial suppression of estradiol levels (median 20–60 pg/mL) occurred at a dosage 100 mg/day. Progesterone levels were also variably suppressed with these dosages.

=== Pharmacokinetics ===
The elimination half-life of linzagolix with repeated administration is approximately 15 hours.

== Society and culture ==
=== Legal status ===
On 16 December 2021, and on 22 April 2022, the Committee for Medicinal Products for Human Use (CHMP) of the European Medicines Agency (EMA) adopted a positive opinion, recommending the granting of a marketing authorization for the medicinal product Yselty, intended for the treatment of symptoms of uterine fibroids. The applicant for this medicinal product is ObsEva Ireland Ltd. Linzagolix was approved for medical use in the European Union in June 2022.

=== Brand names ===
Linzagolix is sold under the brand name Yselty.

=== Availability ===
Linzagolix is available in the European Union and in the United Kingdom.
