= Cetrorelix =

Drug used in IVF procedures

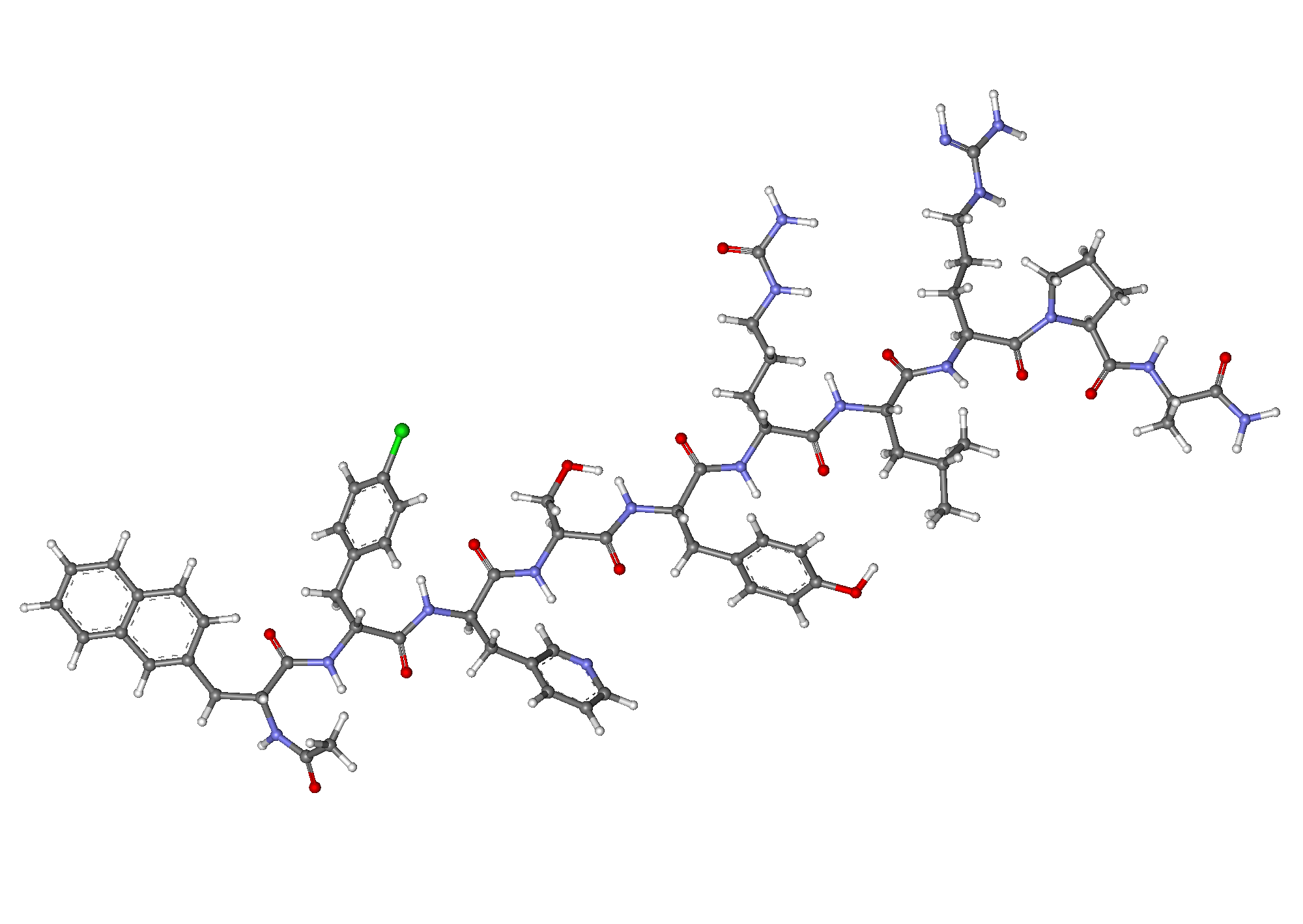

Clinical data
- Trade names: Cetrotide, others
- AHFS/Drugs.com: Monograph
- Routes of administration: Subcutaneous injection
- Drug class: GnRH analogue; GnRH antagonist; Antigonadotropin
- ATC code: H01CC02 (WHO)

Legal status
- Legal status: AU: S4 (Prescription only); US: ℞-only; EU: Rx-only

Pharmacokinetic data
- Bioavailability: 85%
- Protein binding: 86%
- Elimination half-life: 62.8 hours / 3 mg single dose; 5 hours / 0.25 mg single dose; 20.6 hours / 0.25 mg multiple doses
- Excretion: feces (5% to 10% as unchanged drug and metabolites); urine (2% to 4% as unchanged drug)

Identifiers
- IUPAC name: Acetyl-D-3-(2′-naphtyl)-alanine-D-4-chlorophenylalanine-D-3-(3′-pyridyl)- alanine-L-serine-L-tyrosine-D-citrulline-L-leucine-L-arginine-L-proline-D-alanine-amide
- CAS Number: 120287-85-6
- PubChem CID: 16130924
- IUPHAR/BPS: 1190
- DrugBank: DB00050
- ChemSpider: 10482082
- UNII: OON1HFZ4BA
- KEGG: D07665
- ChEBI: CHEBI:59224
- ChEMBL: ChEMBL1200490
- CompTox Dashboard (EPA): DTXSID7040996
- ECHA InfoCard: 100.212.148

Chemical and physical data
- Formula: C_{70}H_{92}ClN_{17}O_{14}
- Molar mass: 1431.06 g·mol^{−1}
- 3D model (JSmol): Interactive image
- SMILES: CC(=O)N[C@H](Cc1ccc2ccccc2c1)C(=O)N[C@H](Cc1ccc(Cl)cc1)C(=O)N[C@H](Cc1cccnc1)C(=O)N[C@@H](CO)C(=O)N[C@@H](Cc1ccc(O)cc1)C(=O)N[C@H](CCCNC(N)=O)C(=O)N[C@@H](CC(C)C)C(=O)N[C@@H](CCCNC(=N)N)C(=O)N1CCC[C@H]1C(=O)N[C@H](C)C(N)=O
- InChI: InChI=1S/C70H92ClN17O14/c1-39(2)31-52(61(94)82-51(15-9-28-77-69(73)74)68(101)88-30-10-16-58(88)67(100)79-40(3)59(72)92)83-60(93)50(14-8-29-78-70(75)102)81-63(96)54(34-43-20-25-49(91)26-21-43)86-66(99)57(38-89)87-65(98)56(36-45-11-7-27-76-37-45)85-64(97)55(33-42-18-23-48(71)24-19-42)84-62(95)53(80-41(4)90)35-44-17-22-46-12-5-6-13-47(46)32-44/h5-7,11-13,17-27,32,37,39-40,50-58,89,91H,8-10,14-16,28-31,33-36,38H2,1-4H3,(H2,72,92)(H,79,100)(H,80,90)(H,81,96)(H,82,94)(H,83,93)(H,84,95)(H,85,97)(H,86,99)(H,87,98)(H4,73,74,77)(H3,75,78,102)/t40-,50-,51+,52+,53-,54+,55-,56-,57+,58+/m1/s1; Key:SBNPWPIBESPSIF-MHWMIDJBSA-N

Cetrorelix (INN, BAN), or cetrorelix acetate (USAN, JAN), sold under the brand name Cetrotide, is an injectable gonadotropin-releasing hormone (GnRH) antagonist. A synthetic decapeptide, it is used in assisted reproduction to inhibit premature luteinizing hormone surges The drug works by blocking the action of GnRH upon the pituitary, thus rapidly suppressing the production and action of luteinizing hormone (LH) and follicle-stimulating hormone (FSH). In addition, cetrorelix can be used to treat hormone-sensitive cancers of the prostate and breast (in pre-/perimenopausal women) and some benign gynaecological disorders (endometriosis, uterine fibroids and endometrial thinning). It is administered as either multiple 0.25 mg daily subcutaneous injections or as a single-dose 3 mg subcutaneous injection. The duration of the 3 mg single dose is four days; if human chorionic gonadotropin (hCG) is not administered within four days, a daily 0.25 mg dose is started and continued until hCG is administered.

It is available as a generic medication.

== Medical uses ==
Cetrorelix is marketed by Merck Serono for use in in-vitro fertilization in all countries except Japan, where it is marketed by Shionogi and Nippon Kayaku. Aeterna Zentaris receives royalties on these sales and retains rights to develop cetrorelix for other indications. In IVF use it is injected daily after follicle stimulation has been initiated and evidence of follicle maturation is approaching; given daily it prevents an endogenous LH surge that would trigger an untimely ovulation prior to the hCG administration by the treating physician. As an alternative to the GnRH antagonist, also a GnRH agonist could be given, but agonist have to be started earlier to overcome the agonistic effect. Cetrorelix can be mixed with follitropin alpha without compromising their reported safety and efficacy.

== Contraindications ==
The use of cetrorelix is contraindicated in severe renal impairment. It is not intended for women aged 65 years or older. Use in women with severe allergic conditions is not recommended. Use with caution in women with active allergies or history of allergies.

== Research ==
Cetrorelix was under development for the treatment of benign prostatic hyperplasia, premenopausal breast cancer, endometriosis, ovarian cancer, prostate cancer, and uterine fibroids, but development for these indications was discontinued.

Cetrorelix was shown to prevent development of reproductive defects induced by injection of anti-Müllerian hormone in a mouse model of polyendocrine metabolic ovarian syndrome (PMOS), suggesting its potential as PMOS therapeutic.

In another study, over a period of 3 weeks, daily injections of cetrorelix were administered to 12 men in order to suppress testosterone levels. Testosterone levels were significantly suppressed as compared to a control group. During this time of suppression, increases in high density lipoproteins (HDLs) were seen. HDLs are responsible for removing cholesterol from the blood and higher amounts are correlated with increased cardiovascular health.
