= Gonadotropin-releasing hormone antagonist =

Class of medications

- Drug class
- Cetrorelix, one of the most widely used GnRH antagonists.

Class identifiers
- Synonyms: GnRH receptor antagonists; GnRH blockers; GnRH inhibitors; Antigonadotropins
- Use: Infertility; Prostate cancer; Precocious puberty; Breast cancer; Endometriosis; Uterine fibroids; Transgender people
- Biological target: GnRH receptor
- Chemical class: Peptides; Non-peptides

Legal status

Gonadotropin-releasing hormone antagonists (GnRH antagonists) are a class of medications that antagonize the gonadotropin-releasing hormone receptor (GnRH receptor) and thus the action of gonadotropin-releasing hormone (GnRH). They are used in the treatment of prostate cancer, endometriosis, uterine fibroids, female infertility in assisted reproduction, and for other indications.

Some GnRH antagonists, such as cetrorelix, are similar in structure to natural GnRH (a hormone made by neurons in the hypothalamus) but have an antagonistic effect, while other GnRH antagonists, such as elagolix and relugolix, are non-peptide and small-molecule compounds. GnRH antagonists compete with natural GnRH for binding to GnRH receptors, thus decreasing or blocking GnRH action in the body.

== Medical uses ==
=== Prostate cancer ===
Testosterone promotes growth of many prostate tumors and therefore reducing circulating testosterone to very low (castration) levels is often the treatment goal in the management of men with advanced prostate cancer. GnRH antagonists are used to provide fast suppression of testosterone without the surge in testosterone levels that is seen when treating patients with GnRH agonists. In patients with advanced disease, this surge in testosterone can lead to a flare-up of the tumour, which can precipitate a range of clinical symptoms such as bone pain, urethral obstruction, and spinal cord compression. Drug agencies have issued warnings regarding this phenomenon in the prescribing information for GnRH agonists. As testosterone surge does not occur with GnRH antagonists, there is no need for patients to receive an antiandrogen as flare protection during prostate cancer treatment. GnRH agonists also induce an increase in testosterone levels after each reinjection of the drug – a phenomenon that does not occur with GnRH antagonists.

The reduction in testosterone levels that occurs during GnRH antagonist therapy subsequently reduces the size of the prostate cancer. This in turn results in a reduction in prostate-specific antigen (PSA) levels in the patient's blood and so measuring PSA levels is a way to monitor how patients with prostate cancer are responding to treatment. GnRH antagonists have an immediate onset of action leading to a fast and profound suppression of testosterone and are therefore especially valuable in the treatment of patients with prostate cancer, where fast control of disease is needed.

The GnRH antagonist abarelix was withdrawn from the United States market in 2005 and is now only marketed in Germany for use in patients with symptomatic prostate cancer. Degarelix is a GnRH antagonist that is approved for use in patients with advanced hormone-sensitive prostate cancer throughout Europe and also in the United States.

=== Fertility treatment ===
GnRH antagonists are also used for short periods in the prevention of premature LH surge and endogenous ovulation in patients undergoing ovarian hyperstimulation with FSH in preparation for in-vitro fertilization (IVF). Typically they are administered in the mid-follicular phase in stimulated cycles after administration of gonadotropins and prior to the administration of hCG – which is given to stimulate ovulation. This protocol is likely beneficial in women expected to be hyper-responders, and probably also those expected to be poor responders to ovarian hyperstimulation. There is probably little or no difference between GnRH antagonist and GnRH agonist protocols in terms of live birth or risk of miscarriage but GnRH antagonists probably reduce the risk of ovarian hyperstimulation syndrome. The GnRH antagonists that are currently licensed for use in fertility treatment are cetrorelix and ganirelix.

=== Uterine disorders ===
Elagolix is indicated for the treatment of moderate to severe endometriosis pain and relugolix is indicated for the treatment of uterine fibroids.

=== Other uses ===
GnRH antagonists are being investigated in the treatment of women with hormone-sensitive breast cancer. In men, they are being investigated in the treatment of benign prostatic hyperplasia and also as potential contraceptive agents. GnRH antagonists could be used as puberty blockers in transgender youth and to suppress sex hormone levels in transgender adolescents and adults.

=== Available forms ===
GnRH antagonists marketed for clinical or veterinary use
Name	Brand/code name(s)	Approved/intended uses	Type	Route(s)	Launch/status*	Hits
Abarelix	Plenaxis	Prostate cancer	Peptide	IM	2003	116,000
Cetrorelix	Cetrotide	Female infertility (assisted reproduction)	Peptide	SC	2000	134,000
Degarelix	Firmagon	Prostate cancer	Peptide	SC	2008	291,000
Elagolix	Orilissa	Endometriosis; Uterine fibroids	Non-peptide	Oral	2018	126,000
Ganirelix	Orgalutran	Female infertility (assisted reproduction)	Peptide	SC	2000	134,000
Linzagolix	KLH-2109; OBE-2109	Endometriosis; Uterine fibroids	Non-peptide	Oral	Phase III	9,730
Relugolix	Relumina	Uterine fibroids, prostate cancer	Non-peptide	Oral	2019	44,900
Notes: Launch/status = Launch year or developmental status (as of February 2018). Hits = Google Search hits (as of February 2018).

Currently approved GnRH antagonists include the peptide molecules abarelix, cetrorelix, degarelix, and ganirelix and the small-molecule compounds elagolix and relugolix. GnRH antagonists are administered by subcutaneous injection (cetrorelix, degarelix, ganirelix), by intramuscular injection (abarelix), or by oral administration (elagolix, relugolix).

Another non-peptide and orally-active GnRH antagonist that is in development is linzagolix.

== Side effects ==
As with all hormonal therapies, GnRH antagonists are commonly associated with hormonal side effects such as hot flushes, headache, nausea and weight gain. When used in fertility treatment they can also be associated with abdominal pain and ovarian hyperstimulation. Subcutaneously administered agents are also associated with injection-site reactions and abarelix (neither of these being GnRH agonists, but instead being antagonists) has been linked with immediate-onset systemic allergic reactions.

== Pharmacology ==
GnRH antagonists competitively and reversibly bind to GnRH receptors in the pituitary gland, blocking the release of luteinizing hormone (LH) and follicle-stimulating hormone (FSH) from the anterior pituitary. In men, the reduction in LH subsequently leads to rapid suppression of testosterone production in the testes; in women it leads to suppression of estradiol and progesterone production from the ovaries. GnRH antagonists are able to abolish gonadal sex hormone production and to suppress sex hormone levels into the castrate range, or by approximately 95%.

Unlike the GnRH agonists, which cause an initial stimulation of the hypothalamic–pituitary–gonadal axis (HPG axis) that leads to a surge in testosterone or estrogen levels, GnRH antagonists have an immediate onset of action and rapidly reduce sex hormone levels without an initial surge.

Hormone levels with GnRH agonists and antagonists
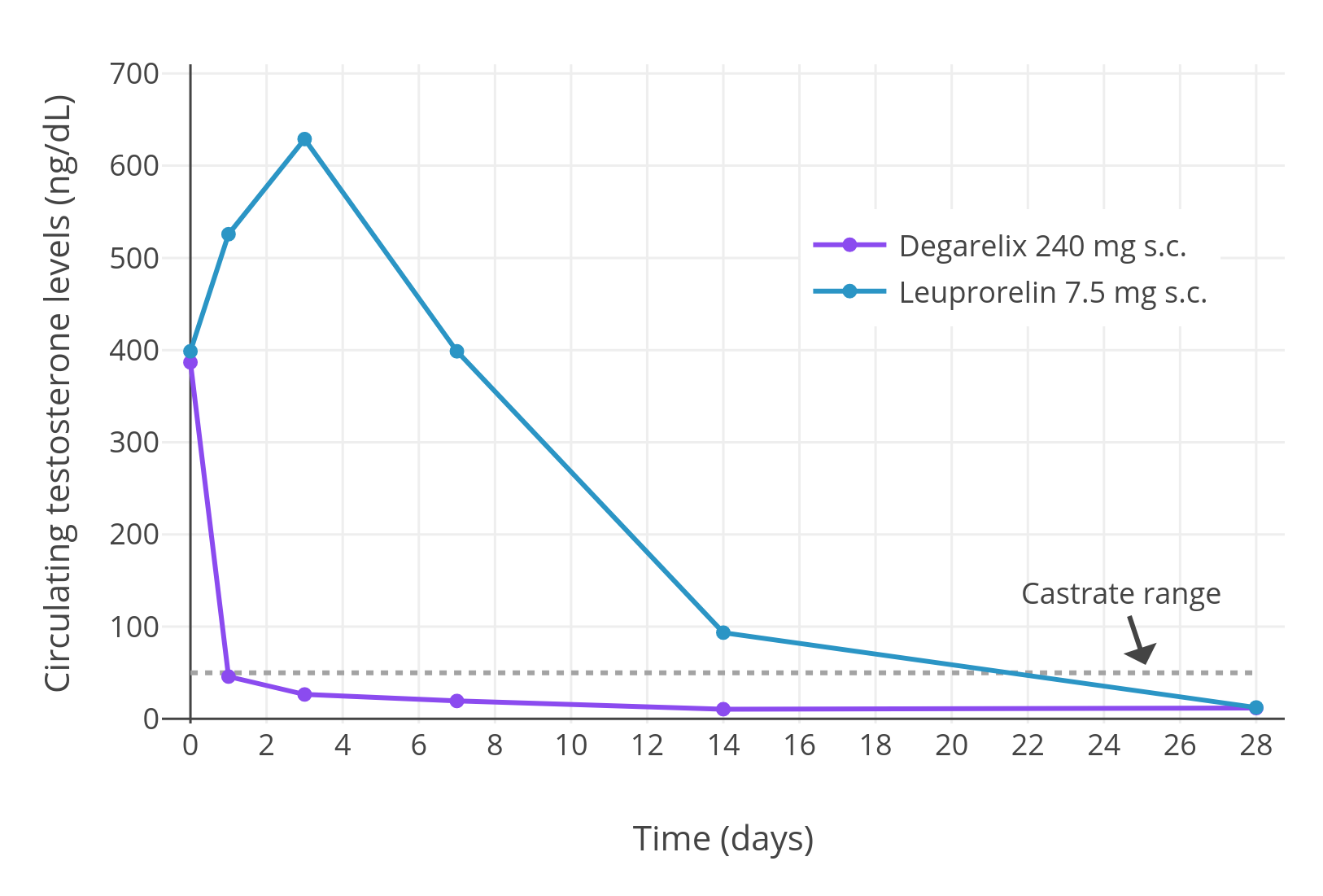
Testosterone levels during the first month of androgen deprivation therapy in men with prostate cancer treated with subcutaneous injections of a GnRH antagonist (degarelix) or agonist (leuprorelin). Doses were 240 then 80 mg/month and 7.5 mg/month, respectively.

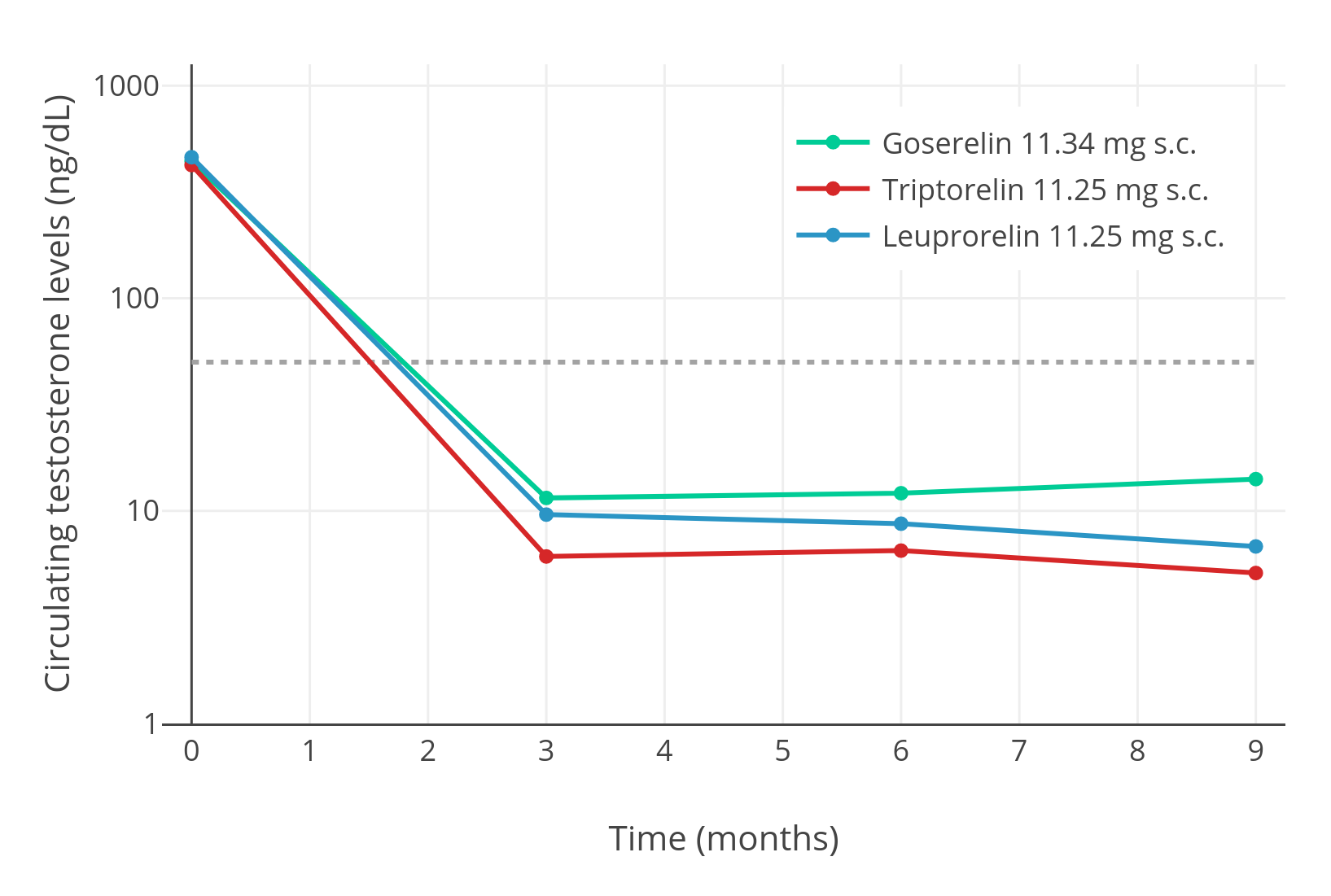
Testosterone levels in the long-term androgen deprivation therapy of men with prostate cancer by different GnRH agonists administered at 3 month intervals (goserelin, triptorelin and leuprorelin). Dotted line is the threshold for the castrate range.

== Chemistry ==
GnRH antagonists include peptides such as cetrorelix and non-peptide and small-molecule compounds such as elagolix. Peptide GnRH antagonists are GnRH analogues.

Chemical structures of peptide GnRH antagonists
Compound	Amino acid sequence	Marketed
Cetrorelix	Ac-D-Nal-D-Cpa-D-Pal-Ser-Tyr-D-Cit-Leu-Arg-Pro-D-Ala-NH_{2}	Yes
Abarelix	Ac-D-Nal-D-Cpa-D-Pal-Ser-N-MeTyr-D-Asn-Leu-Lys(iPr)-Pro-D-Ala-NH_{2}	Yes
Ganirelix	Ac-D-Nal-D-Cpa-D-Pal-Ser-Tyr-D-hArg(Et)_{2}-Leu-hArg(Et)_{2}-Pro-D-Ala-NH_{2}	Yes
Degarelix	Ac-D-Nal-D-Cpa-D-Pal-Ser-Aph(Hor)-D-Aph(Cba)-Leu-Lys(iPr)-Pro-D-Ala-NH_{2}	Yes
Teverelix	Ac-D-Nal-D-Cpa-D-Pal-Ser-Tyr-D-hCit-Leu-Lys(iPr)-Pro-D-Ala-NH_{2}	No
Ozarelix	Ac-D-Nal-D-Cpa-D-Pal-Ser-N-MeTyr-D-hCit-Nle-Arg-Pro-D-Ala-NH_{2}	No
Ornirelix	Ac-D-Nal-D-Cpa-D-Pal-Ser-Lys(Pic)-D-Orn(6Anic)-Leu-Lys(iPr)-Pro-D-Ala-NH_{2}	No
Iturelix	Ac-D-Nal-D-Cpa-D-Pal-Ser-Lys(Nic)-D-Lys(Nic)-Leu-Lys(iPr)-Pro-D-Ala-NH_{2}	No
Acyline	Ac-D-Nal-D-Cpa-D-Pal-Ser-Aph(Ac)-D-Aph(Ac)-Leu-Lys(iPr)-Pro-D-Ala-NH_{2}	No
Azaline B	Ac-D-Nal-D-Cpa-D-Pal-Ser-Aph(Atz)-D-Aph(Atz)-Leu-Lys(iPr)-Pro-D-Ala-NH_{2}	No

== See also ==
- Gonadotropin-releasing hormone modulator
- Gonadotropin-releasing hormone agonist
