= Thin =

Thin may refer to:

- Thin (film), a 2006 documentary about eating disorders
- Thin, a web server based on Mongrel
- Thin (name), including a list of people with the name
- Mal language, also known as Thin

== See also ==
- Body shape
- Emaciation
- Underweight
- Paper Thin (disambiguation)
- Thin capitalisation
- Thin client, a computer in a client-server architecture network.
- Thin film, a material layer of about 1 μm thickness.
- Thin-layer chromatography (TLC), a chromatography technique used in chemistry to separate chemical compounds
- Thin layers (oceanography), congregations of phytoplankton and zooplankton in the water column
- Thin lens, lens with a thickness that is negligible compared to the focal length of the lens in optics
- Thin Lizzy, Irish rock band formed in Dublin in 1969
- Thin Man (disambiguation)
- The Thin Blue Line (disambiguation)
