= Body shape =

General shape of a human body

1972 line art depiction of nude man and woman from the Pioneer plaques

Human body shape is a complex phenomenon with sophisticated detail and function. The general shape or figure of a person is defined mainly by the molding of skeletal structures, as well as the distribution of muscles and fat. Skeletal structure grows and changes only up to the point at which a human reaches adulthood and remains essentially the same for the rest of their life. Growth is usually completed between the ages of 13 and 18, at which time the epiphyseal plates of long bones close, allowing no further growth (see Human skeleton).

Many aspects of body shape vary with gender and the female body shape especially has a complicated cultural history. The science of measuring and assessing body shape is called anthropometry.

== Physiology ==
During puberty, differentiation of the male and female body occurs for the purpose of reproduction. In adult humans, muscle mass may change due to exercise, and fat distribution may change due to hormone fluctuations. Inherited genes play a large part in the development of body shape.

=== Facial features ===
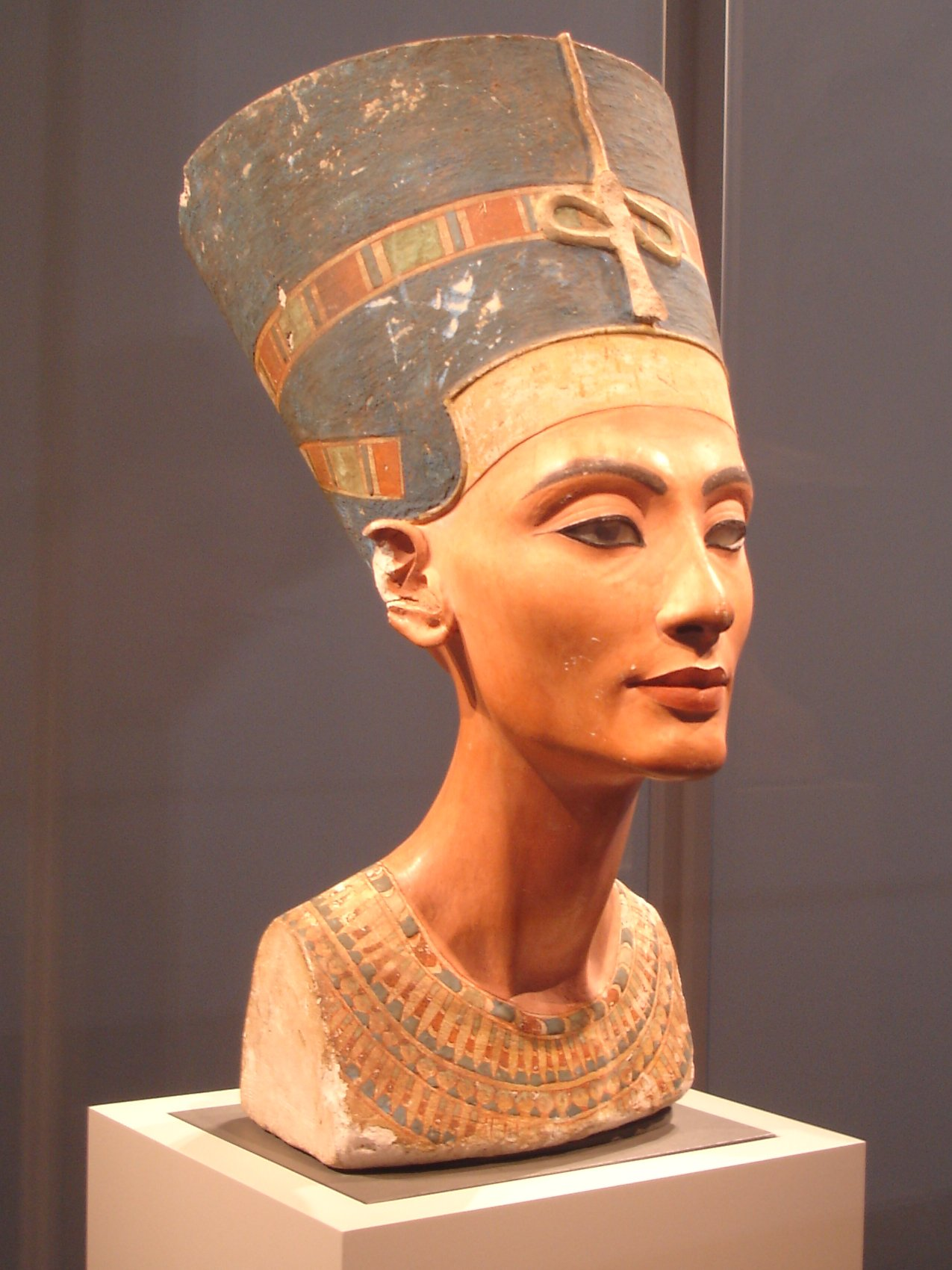
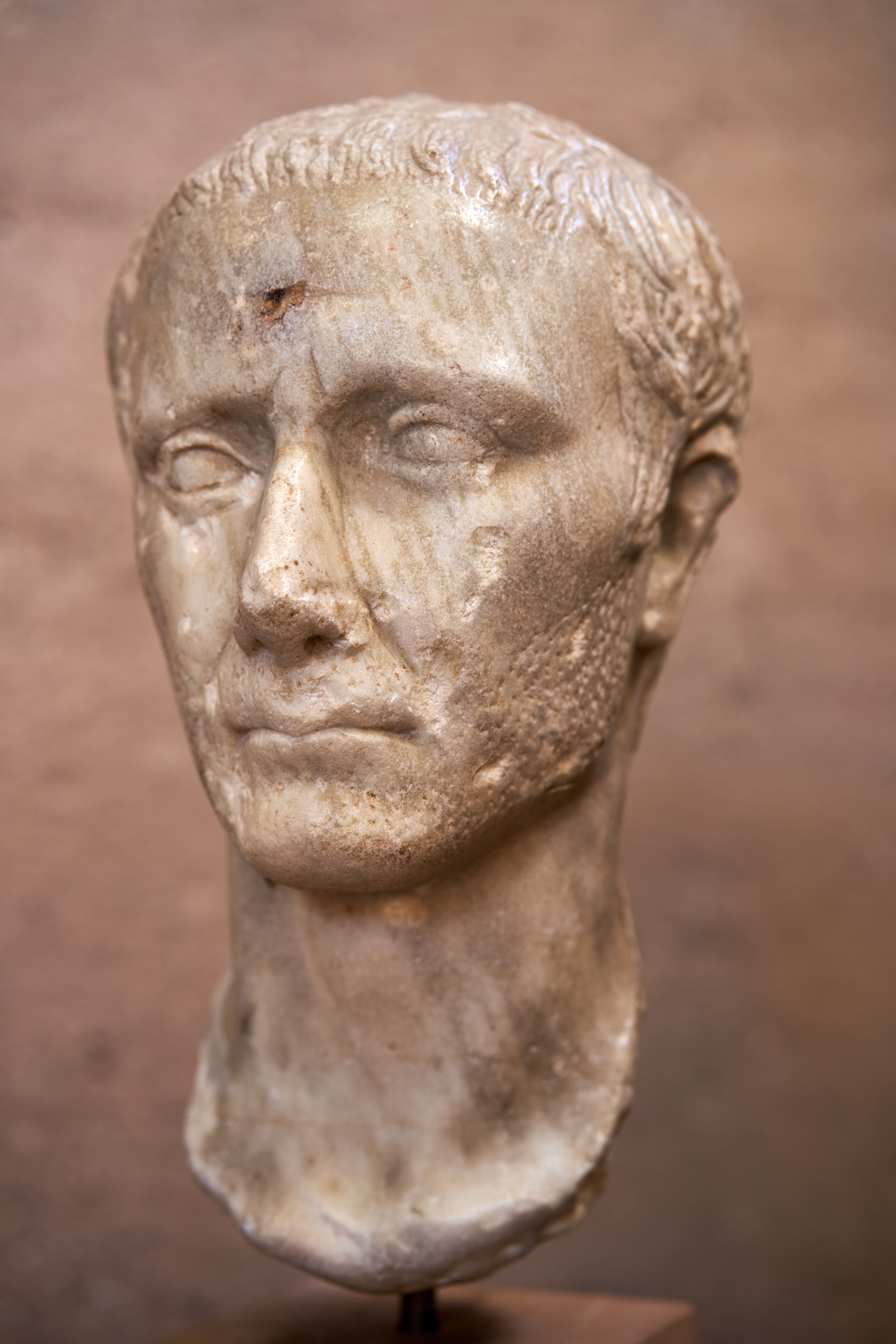
Classical female and male faces

Due to the action of testosterone, males may develop these facial-bone features during puberty:

- A more prominent brow bone (bone across the centre of the forehead from around the middle of eyebrow across to the middle of the other) and a larger nose bone.
- A heavier jaw.
- A high facial width-to-height ratio. However some studies dispute this, and testosterone reduces cheekbone prominence in males.
- A more prominent chin.

Because females have around 1/15 (6.67%) the amount of testosterone of a male, the testosterone-dependent features do not develop to the same extent, and thus female faces are generally less changed from those of pre-pubertal children.

=== Skeletal structure ===
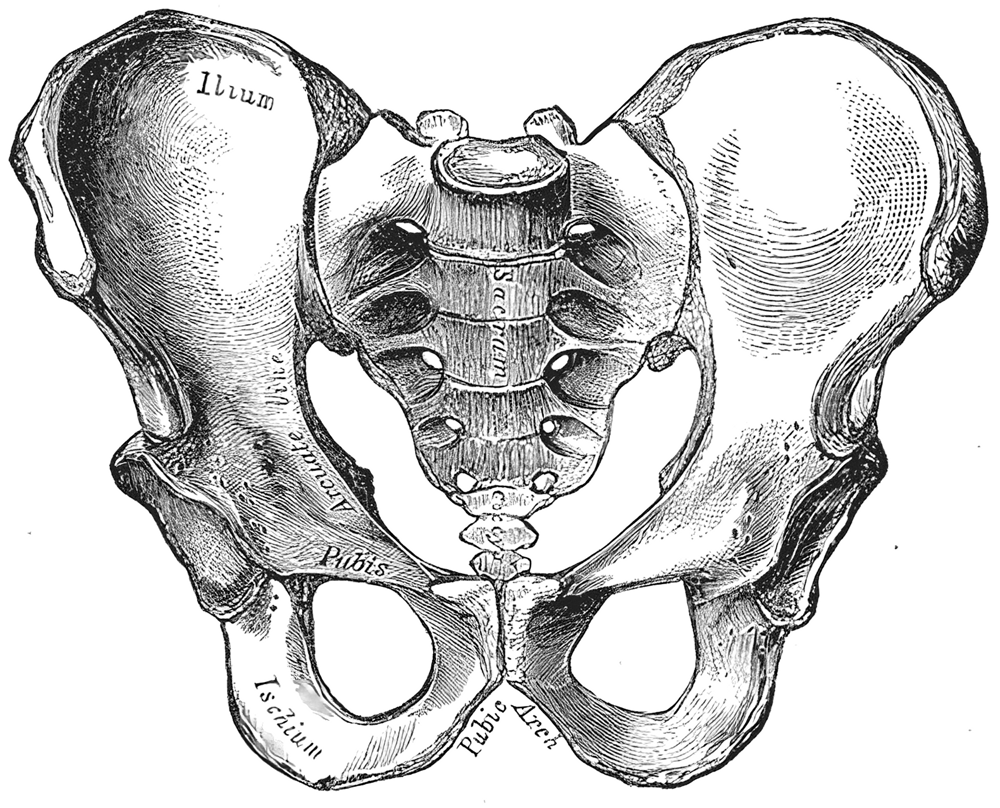
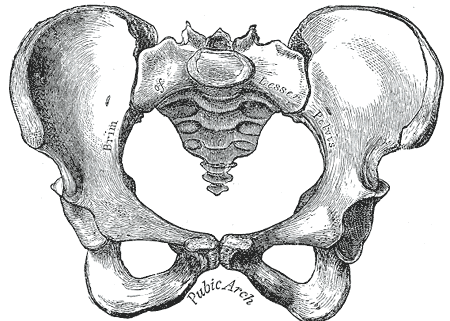
Comparison between a male (left) and a female pelvis (right). Females generally have wider hips relative to males in the same population. (Images not to scale.)

Skeletal structure frames the overall shape of the body and does not alter much after maturity. Males are, on average, taller, but body shape may be analyzed after normalizing with respect to height. The length of each bone is constant, but the joint angle will change as the bone moves. The dynamics of biomechanical movement will be different depending on the pelvic morphology for the same principle. The fascia anatomy of the sides of the sacral diamond area, which regulates its shape and movement, corresponds to the fascial thickenings that are part of the sacral complex of the thoracambular fascia, which surrounds the sacroiliac joints both posteriorly and, from the iliolumbar ligaments, anteriorly. The biochemical properties of the muscular bands have repercussions from the inside to the outside and vice versa. The shape of the posterior muscular and adipose tissues seems to correspond with the general pelvic morphology. The classification is as follows the gynecoid pelvis corresponds to a round buttocks shape, the platypelloid pelvis to a triangle shape, the anthropoid pelvis to a square shape and the android pelvis to a trapezoidal gluteus region. The trapezoidal shape is what gives steatopygia its specific shape and appearance.

==== Female traits ====
Widening of the hip bones occurs as part of the female pubertal process, and estrogens (the predominant sex hormones in females) cause a widening of the pelvis as a part of sexual differentiation. Hence females generally have wider hips, permitting childbirth. Because the female pelvis is flatter, more rounded and proportionally larger, the head of the fetus may pass during childbirth. The sacrum in females is shorter and wider, and also directed more toward the rear (see image). This sometimes affects their walking style, resulting in hip sway. The upper limb in females have an outward angulation (carrying angle) at elbow level to accommodate the wider pelvis. After puberty, hips are generally wider than shoulders. However, not all females adhere to this stereotypical pattern of secondary sex characteristics. Males and females generally have the same hormones, but blood concentrations and site sensitivity differs between males and females. Males produce primarily testosterone with small amounts of estrogen and progesterone, while women produce primarily estrogen and progesterone and small amounts of testosterone.

==== Male traits ====
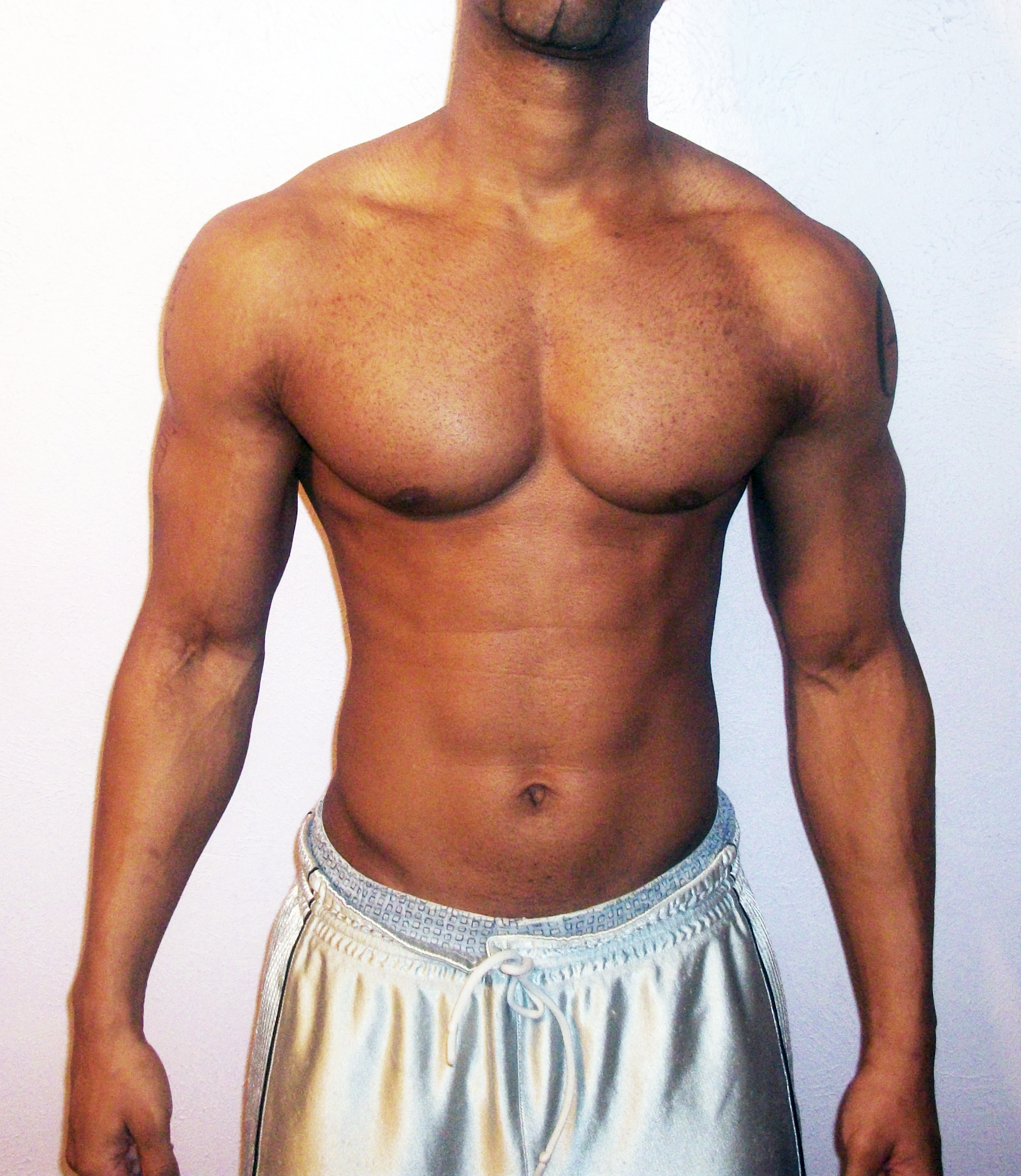
An adult man with a "V-shaped body"; pronounced shoulder width and expanded chest, both traits typically associated with male physique

Widening of the shoulders occurs as part of the male pubertal process. The expansion of the ribcage takes place during puberty as well.

=== Fat distribution, muscles and tissues ===
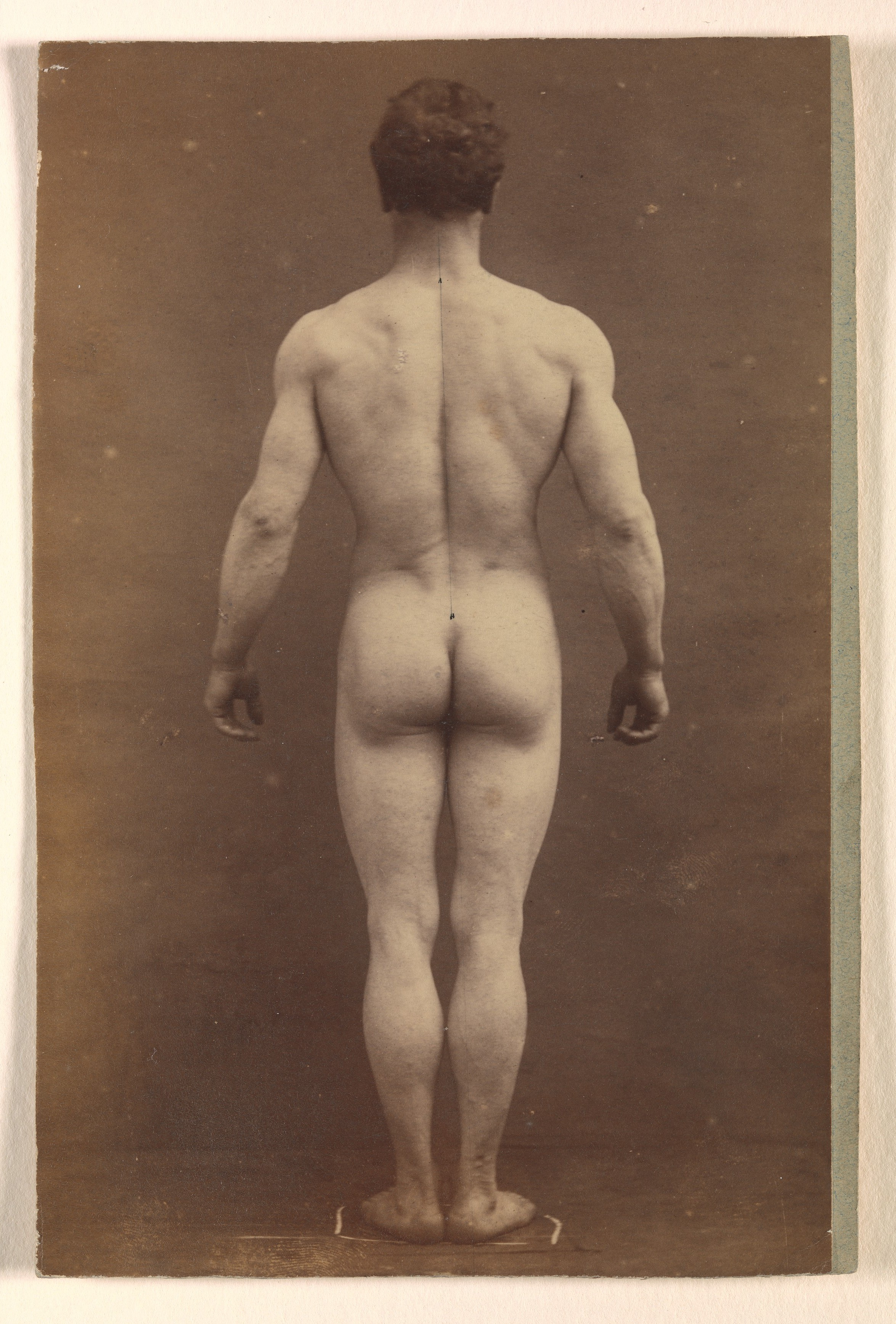
The rear view of a naked adult man with a "V-shaped body". Male Musculature Study - photograph by Albert Londe, Paul Marie Louis Pierre Richer (MET, 2012.59)

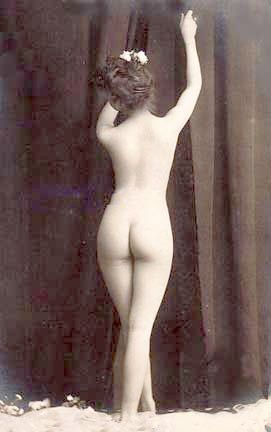
The rear view of a naked adult woman with pronounced hip width and large buttocks, both typically associated with female physique

Body shape is affected by body fat distribution, which is correlated to current levels of sex hormones. Unlike bone structure, muscles and fat distribution may change from time to time, depending on food habits, exercises and hormone levels.

==== Fat distribution ====
Estrogen causes fat to be stored in the buttocks, thighs, and hips in females. When females reach menopause and the estrogen produced by ovaries declines, fat migrates from their buttocks, hips and thighs to their waists. Later fat is stored in the belly, similar to males. Thus females generally have relatively narrow waists and large buttocks, and this along with wide hips make for a wider hip section and a lower waist–hip ratio compared to males.

Estrogen increases fat storage in the body, which results in more fat stored in the female body. Body fat percentage guidelines are higher for females, as this may serve as an energy reserve for pregnancy. Males generally deposit fat around their trunk and upper body (indicative of android fat distribution) but may display variations due to differences in genetics and hormones.

Transgender men and those who begin masculinizing hormone therapy see body fat redistributed within 3–6 months. Within 5 years, testosterone may cause gynoid fat to be significantly reduced. Inversely, transgender women, or those who begin feminizing hormone therapy, experience the formation of gynoid fat along with natural breast development.

==== Muscles ====
Testosterone helps build and maintain muscles through exercise. On average, men have around 5-20 times more testosterone than women and naturally and biologically males gain more muscle mass and size than women. However, women can also build muscle mass by increasing their testosterone level naturally. Prominent muscles of the body include the latissimus dorsi and trapezius in the back, pectoral muscles and rectus abdominis (abdomen) in the chest and stomach respectively, as well as biceps and triceps in the arms and gluteus maximus, quadriceps and hamstrings in the thighs.

==== Breasts ====
Females have breasts due to functional mammary glands, which develop in puberty from the influence of various hormones such as thyroxine, cortisol, progesterone, estrogen, insulin, prolactin, and human growth hormone. Mammary glands do not contain muscle tissue. The shape of female breasts is affected by age, genetic factors, and body weight. Women's breasts tend to grow larger after menopause, due to increase in fatty deposits caused by decreasing levels of estrogen. The loss of elasticity from connective tissue associated with menopause also causes sagging.

=== Weight ===
Being overweight or underweight affects the human body's shape as well as posture and walking style. This is measured using Body Mass Index (BMI). Depending on the BMI, a body may be referred to as underweight, normal, overweight, or obese. A person with a BMI below 18.5 is classed as underweight, between 18.5 and 24.9 is ideal, above 24.9 is overweight and a BMI of 30 or higher is defined as obese.

=== Body posture and gait ===
Body shape has effects on body posture and gait, and has a major role in physical attraction. This is because a body's shape implies an individual's hormone levels during puberty, which implies fertility, and it also indicates current levels of sex hormones. A pleasing shape also implies good health and fitness of the body. Posture also affects body shape as different postures significantly alter body measurements, which thus can alter a body's shape.

== Impact on health ==
According to the Heart and Stroke Foundation of Canada, those people with a larger waist (apple shaped) have higher health risks than those who carry excess weight on the hips and thighs (pear shaped). People with apple shaped bodies who carry excess weight are at greater risk of high blood pressure, Type 2 diabetes and high cholesterol. The United Kingdom's National Institute for Health and Care Excellence advises that a person's waist-to-height ratio (WtHR) should not exceed 0.5, and that this rule applies to everyone from the age of five and is irrespective of gender, ethnicity or BMI.

=== Fitness and exercise ===
Different forms of exercises are practised for the fitness of the body and also for health. It was believed that targeted exercise reduces fat in specific parts of the body – for example, that exercising muscles around the belly reduces fat in the belly. Fitness coaches, medical professionals and physiologists consider the claim to be disproved. These exercises may change body shape by improving muscle tone but any fat reduction is not specific to the locale. Exercising reduces fat throughout the body, and where fat is stored depends on hormones.

== Social and cultural ideals ==
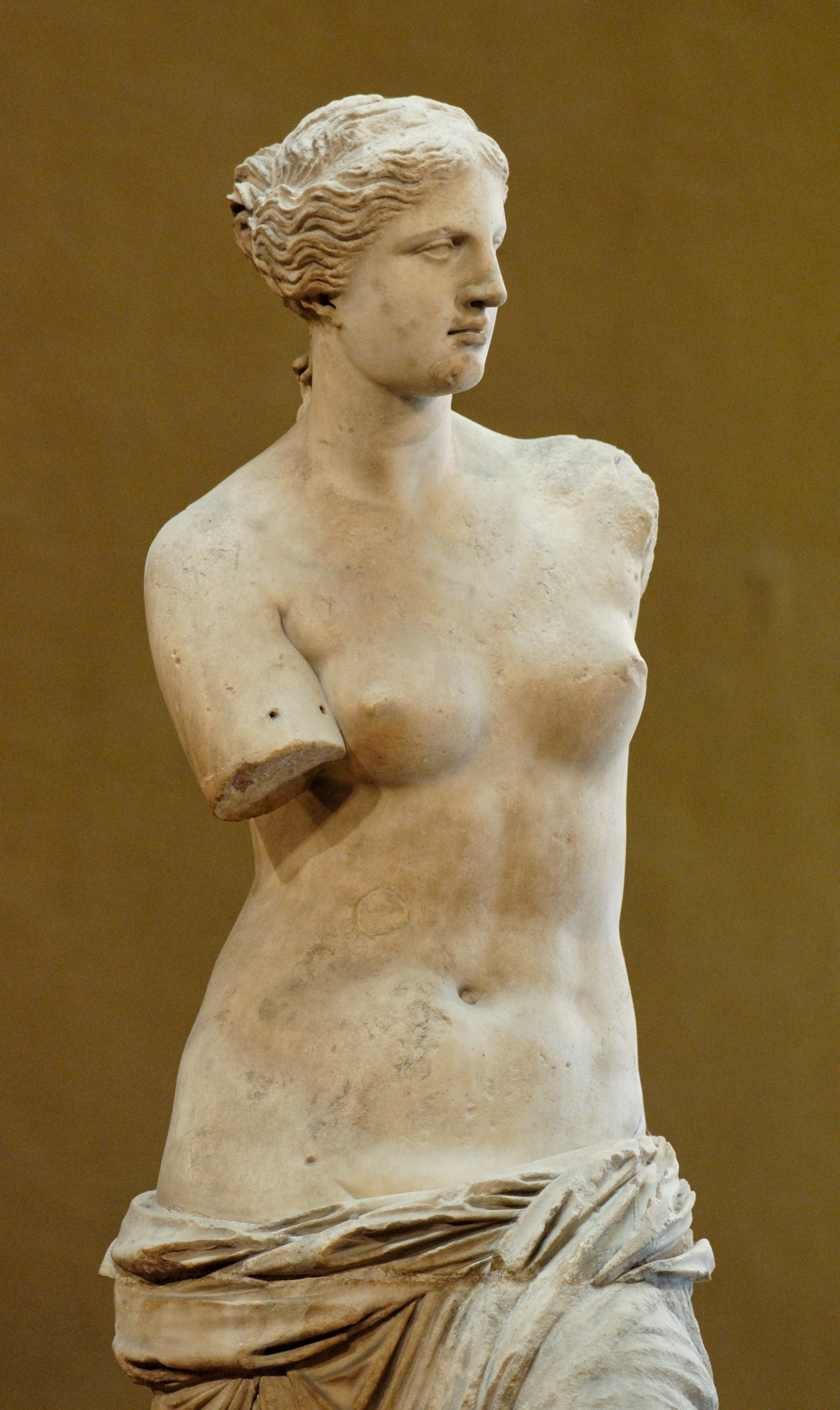
Venus de Milo at the Louvre has been described as a "classical vision of beauty". (Note: However, one expert suggested that her "almost matronly representation" was meant to convey an "impressive appearance" rather than "ideal female beauty".)

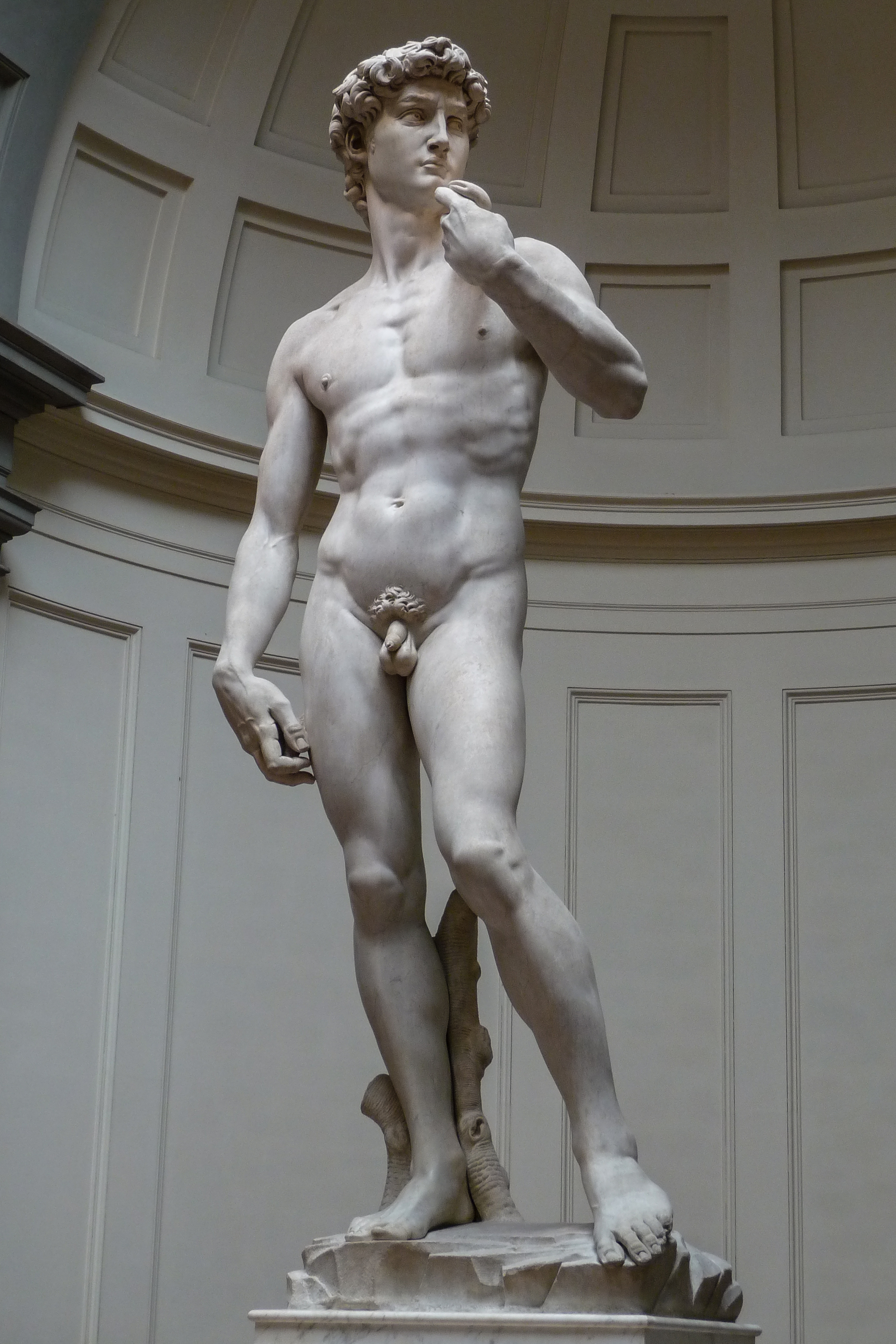
Michelangelo's David is considered a symbol of young male beauty and strength.

The general body shapes of female and male bodies both have significant social and cultural symbolism. Physical attractiveness is closely associated with traits that are considered typical of either sex. The body mass index (BMI), waist-to-hip ratio, and especially waist-to-chest ratio in men have been shown in studies to rank as overall more desirable to women. To be deemed to have an "athletic built"/build is usually a reference to wide shoulders, a muscular upper body and well-developed upper-arm muscles which are all traits closely associated with masculinity, similarly to other specifics of the male sex, like beards. These traits are seen more sexually attractive to women and also associated with higher intelligence, good leadership qualities and better health.

== Terminology ==
Classifications of female body sizes are mainly based on the circumference of the bust–waist–hip (BWH), as in 90-60-90 (centimeters) or 36–24–36 (inches) respectively. In this case, the waist–hip ratio is 60/90 or 24/36 = 0.67. Many terms or classifications are used to describe body shape types:

- Inverted triangle or V-shape: Males often tend to have proportionally smaller buttocks, bigger chests and wider shoulders, wider latissimus dorsi and a small waist which makes for a V-shape of the torso. This shape can be found in 14% females as well.
- Hourglass shape: Found in 8% of females making it the least common female body shapes, it is narrower in the waist both in front view and profile view. The waist is narrower than the chest region due to the breasts, and narrower than the hip region due to the width of the buttocks, which results in an hourglass figure.
- Apple: The stomach region is wider than the hip section, mainly seen in males and some females. It is referred to as android fat distribution.
- Pear or spoon or bell: The hip section is wider than the upper body, mainly found in 20% females. It is referred to as gynoid fat distribution.
- Rectangle or straight or banana: The hip, waist, and shoulder sections are relatively similar.

== See also ==
- Body image – Aesthetic perception of one's own body
- Body proportions – Proportions of the human body in art
- Body mass index – Relative weight based on mass and height (BMI)
- Body roundness index – Body scale based on waist circumference and height (BRI)
- Bust/waist/hip measurements – Measures used for fitting clothing ("Vital statistics")
- Dad bod – Slang term for a body shape particular to middle-aged men
- Female body shape – Characteristic of human females
- Gracility – Slenderness of build
- Human gait – Pattern of limb movements made during locomotion
- Human physical appearance – Look, outward phenotype
  - Phenotype – Composite of the organism's observable characteristics or traits
- List of human positions – Physical configurations of the human body
- Human skeleton – Internal framework of the human body
- Sex differences in humans – Difference between males and females
- Sexual dimorphism – Sex-specific adaptations
- Somatotype and constitutional psychology – Taxonomy to categorize human physiques
  - Eugenics – Effort to improve purported human genetic quality (discredited fringe theory)
- Waist–hip ratio
- Waist-to-height ratio
