= Thin (name) =

Thin is a Burmese name that may refer to the following notable people:

- Thin Thin (disambiguation), multiple people
- Thin Sumbwegam (born 1930), Burmese long-distance runner
- Aung Thin (1927–2014), Burmese writer
- Cherry Thin (born 1996), Burmese singer
- Htoo Eain Thin (1963–2004), Burmese singer-songwriter
- Nyo Nyo Thin (born 1967), Burmese lawyer and politician
- Phyu Phyu Thin (born 1971), Burmese politician

== See also ==
- Thon (name)
