= Feminizing hormone therapy =

Type of gender-affirming medical treatment

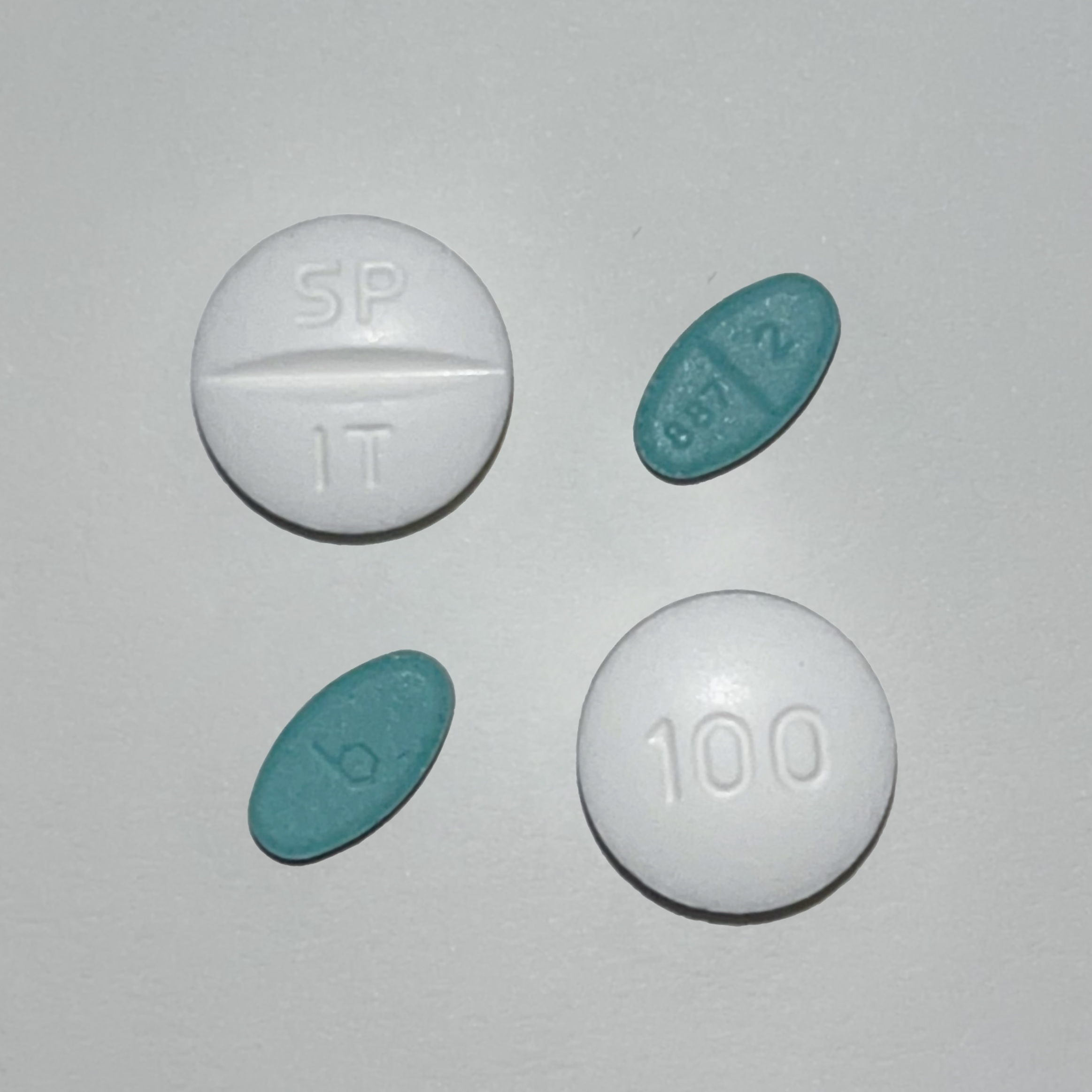
Pills of estradiol and spironolactone

Feminizing hormone therapy, also known as transfeminine hormone therapy, is a form of gender-affirming hormone therapy (GAHT) which change the primary and secondary sex characteristics of transgender people from masculine to feminine. It is one of the two common types of GAHT (the other being masculinizing hormone therapy) and is used to treat transgender women and non-binary transfeminine individuals. Some others, in particular intersex people, but also some non-transgender people, take this form of therapy according to their personal needs and preferences.

The purpose of the therapy is to cause the development of the secondary sex characteristics of the desired sex, such as breasts and a feminine pattern of fat, hair, and muscle distribution. It cannot undo many of the changes produced by naturally occurring puberty, which may necessitate surgery and other treatments to reverse (see below). The medications used for feminizing hormone therapy include estrogens, antiandrogens, progestogens, and gonadotropin-releasing hormone modulators (GnRH modulators).

Feminizing hormone therapy has been empirically shown to reduce the distress and discomfort associated with gender dysphoria in transfeminine individuals.

== Requirements ==
Many physicians operate by the World Professional Association of Transgender Health (WPATH) Standards of Care (SoC) model and require psychotherapy and a letter of recommendation from a psychotherapist in order for a transgender person to obtain hormone therapy. Other physicians operate by an informed consent model and have no requirements for transgender hormone therapy aside from consent.

Medications used in transgender hormone therapy are also sold without a prescription on the Internet by unregulated online pharmacies, and some transgender women purchase these medications and treat themselves using a do-it-yourself (DIY) or self-medication approach. One reason that many transgender people turn to DIY hormone therapy is due to long waiting lists of up to years for standard physician-based hormone therapy in some parts of the world such as the United Kingdom, as well as due to the often high costs of seeing a physician and the restrictive criteria that make some ineligible for treatment, or simply medical malpractice by physicians that are not adequately trained.

The accessibility of transgender hormone therapy differs throughout the world and throughout individual countries.

== Medications ==
A variety of different sex-hormonal medications are used in feminizing hormone therapy for transgender women. These include estrogens to induce feminization and suppress testosterone levels; antiandrogens such as androgen receptor antagonists, antigonadotropins, GnRH modulators, and 5α-reductase inhibitors to further oppose the effects of androgens like testosterone; and progestogens for various possible though uncertain benefits. An estrogen in combination with an antiandrogen is the mainstay of feminizing hormone therapy for transgender women.

=== Estrogens ===
Estrogens are the major sex hormones in women, and are responsible for the development and maintenance of feminine secondary sexual characteristics, such as breasts, wide hips, and a feminine pattern of fat distribution. Estrogens act by binding to and activating the estrogen receptor (ER), their biological target in the body. A variety of different forms of estrogens are available and used medically. The most common estrogens used in transgender women include estradiol, which is the predominant natural estrogen in women, and estradiol esters such as estradiol valerate and estradiol cypionate, which are prodrugs of estradiol. Conjugated estrogens (Premarin), which are used in menopausal hormone therapy, and ethinylestradiol, which is used in birth control pills, have been used in transgender women in the past, but are no longer recommended and are rarely used today due to their higher risks of blood clots and cardiovascular problems. Estrogens may be administered orally, sublingually, transdermally/topically (via patch or gel), rectally, by intramuscular or subcutaneous injection, or by an implant. Parenteral (non-oral) routes are practically preferred, owing to a minimal or negligible risk of blood clots and cardiovascular issues.

The pharmacokinetics of estradiol's routes of administration vary greatly. Sublingual and rectal administration result in peak concentrations up to ten times higher than oral administration, and higher trough concentrations. This makes frequent, small sublingual or rectal doses a very efficient way to create a stable and constant increase in trough levels. A large amount of estradiol consumed sublingually, and especially orally is converted by the GI tract into estrone and other compounds, causing a higher estrone:estradiol (E1:E2) ratio. This means oral doses are more subject to individual variances in enzymes and physiological chemistry. A high estrone ratio is linked to reduced skeletal growth in pubertal boys and insulin resistance in polyendocrine metabolic ovarian syndrome (PMOS). The ratio is also known to be higher in early female puberty (~1:3), and lower in the later stages (~1:5). An average dose intramuscular injection can vary from far above to far below the average female range over the course of a week, depending on an individual's body.

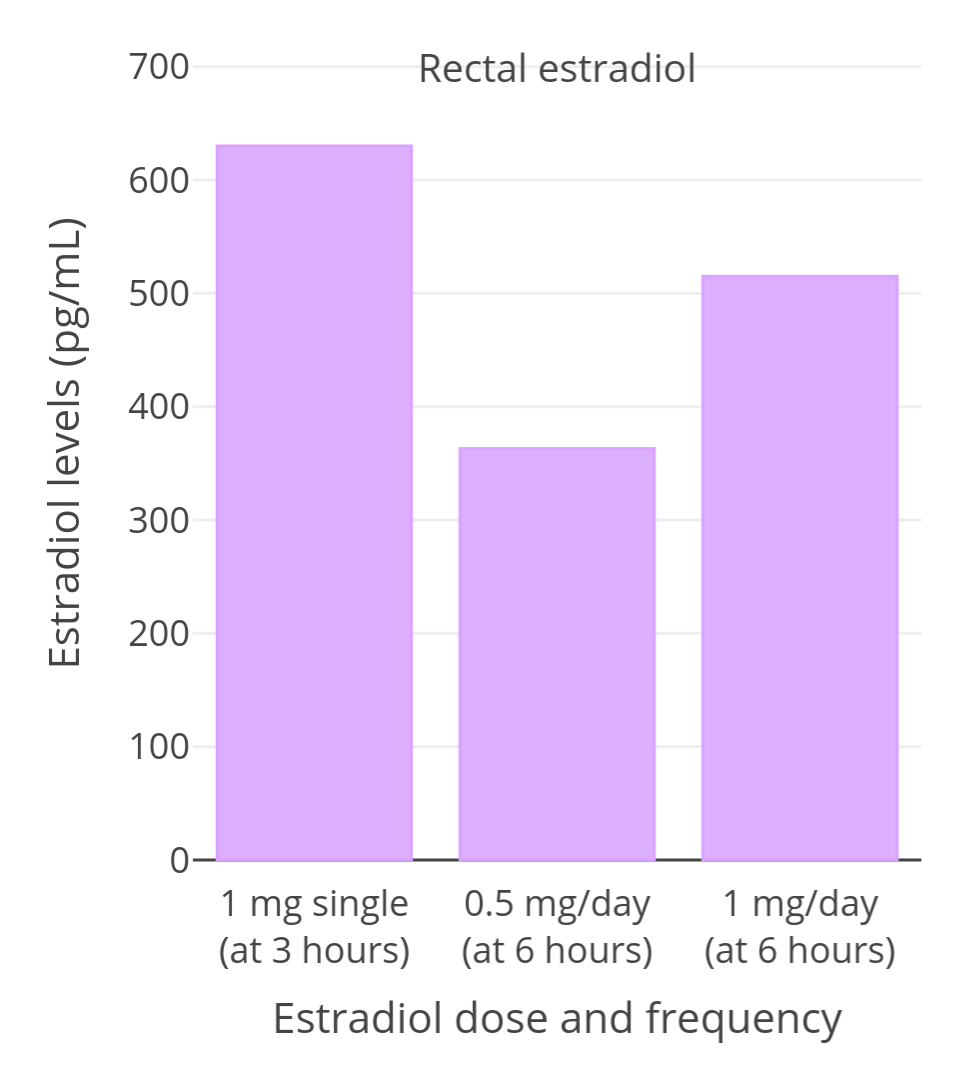
Estradiol blood levels with rectal administration.

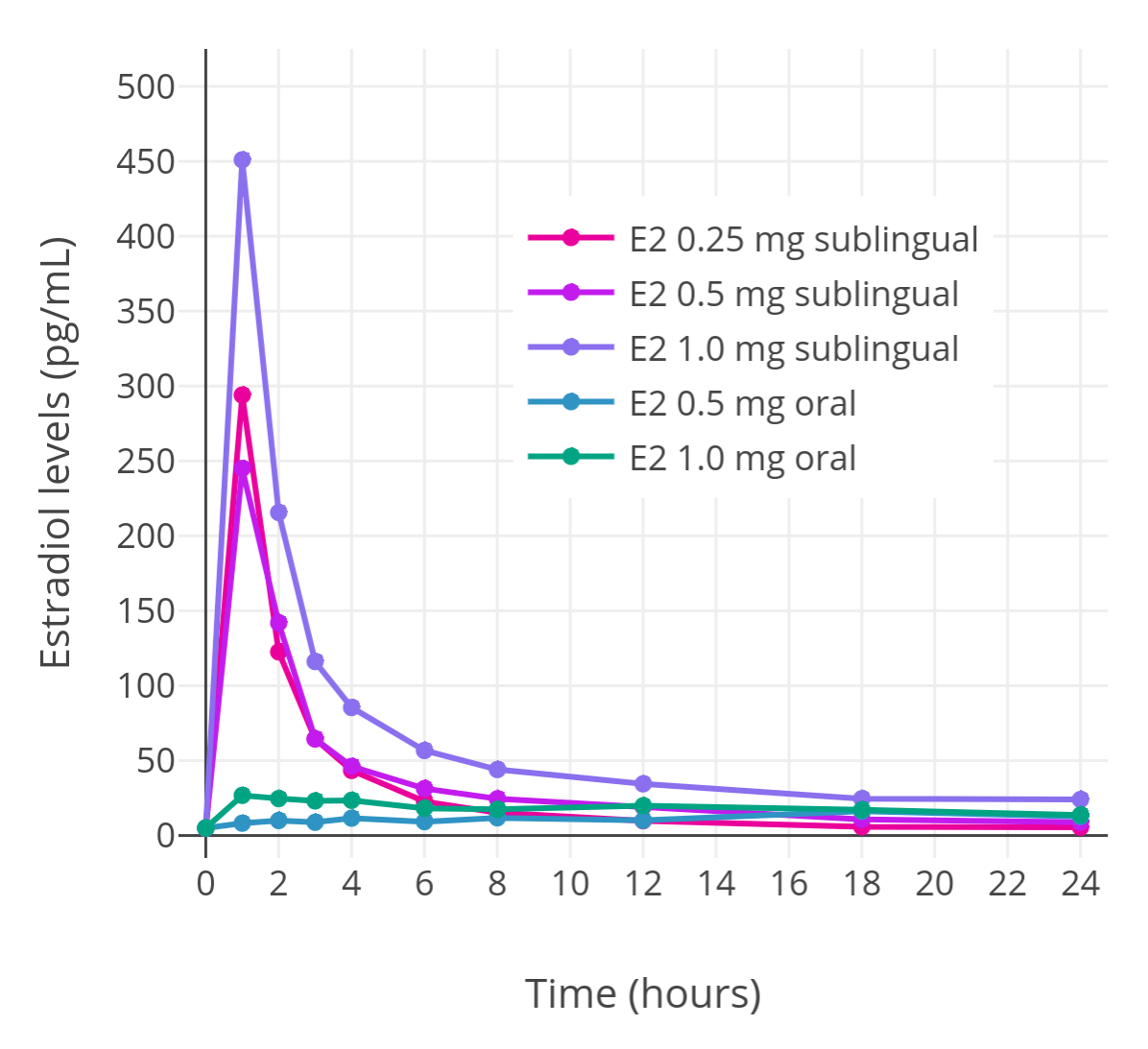
Estradiol levels with oral versus sublingual routes of administration of estradiol in postmenopausal women.

In addition to producing feminization, estrogens have antigonadotropic effects, suppressing testosterone and other gonadal sex hormones. Levels of estradiol of 200 pg/mL and above suppress testosterone levels by about 90%, while estradiol levels of 500 pg/mL and above suppress testosterone levels by about 95%, or to an equivalent extent as surgical castration and GnRH modulators. Lower levels of estradiol can also considerably but incompletely suppress testosterone production. When testosterone levels are insufficiently suppressed by estradiol alone, antiandrogens can be used to suppress or block the effects of residual testosterone. Oral estradiol often has difficulty adequately suppressing testosterone levels, due to the relatively low estradiol levels achieved with it.

Medications and dosages used in transgender women (Note: Additional sources:)
Medication	Brand name	Type	Route	Dosage (Note: Lower starting doses may be used in adolescents if being used in combination with a GnRH agonist or antagonist.)
Estradiol	Various	Estrogen	Oral	2–10 mg/day
Estradiol	Various	Estrogen	Sublingual	1–8 mg/day
Estradiol	Climara (Note: Also available under other brand names.)	Estrogen	TD patch	25–400 μg/day
Estradiol	Divigel	Estrogen	TD gel	0.5–5 mg/day
Estradiol	Various	Estrogen	SC implant	50–200 mg every 6–24 mos
Estradiol valerate	Progynova	Estrogen	Oral	2–10 mg/day
Estradiol valerate	Progynova	Estrogen	Sublingual	1–8 mg/day
Estradiol valerate	Delestrogen	Estrogen	IM, SC	2–10 mg/wk or 5–20 mg every 2 wks
Estradiol cypionate	Depo-Estradiol	Estrogen	IM, SC	2–10 mg/wk or 5–20 mg every 2 wks
Estradiol dipropionate	Agofollin	Estrogen	IM, SC	2–10 mg/wk or 5–20 mg every 2 wks
Estradiol benzoate	Progynon-B	Estrogen	IM, SC	0.5–1.5 mg every 2–3 days
Estriol	Ovestin	Estrogen	Oral	4–6 mg/day
Spironolactone	Aldactone	Antiandrogen	Oral	100–400 mg/day
Cyproterone acetate	Androcur	Antiandrogen; Progestogen	Oral	5–100 mg/day
Cyproterone acetate	Androcur Depot	Antiandrogen; Progestogen	IM	300 mg/month
Bicalutamide	Casodex	Antiandrogen	Oral	25–50 mg/day
Enzalutamide	Xtandi	Antiandrogen	Oral	160 mg/day
GnRH analogue	Various	GnRH modulator	Various	Variable
Elagolix	Orilissa	GnRH antagonist	Oral	150 mg/day or 200 mg twice daily
Finasteride	Propecia	5αR inhibitor	Oral	1–5 mg/day
Dutasteride	Avodart	5αR inhibitor	Oral	0.25–0.5 mg/day
Progesterone	Prometrium	Progestogen	Oral	100–400 mg/day
Medroxyprogesterone acetate	Provera	Progestogen	Oral	2.5–40 mg/day
Medroxyprogesterone acetate	Depo-Provera	Progestogen	IM	150 mg every 3 mos
Medroxyprogesterone acetate	Depo-SubQ Provera 104	Progestogen	SC	104 mg every 3 mos
Hydroxyprogesterone caproate	Proluton	Progestogen	IM	250 mg/wk
Dydrogesterone	Duphaston	Progestogen	Oral	20 mg/day
Drospirenone	Slynd	Progestogen	Oral	3 mg/day
Domperidone (Note: For induction of lactation to allow for breastfeeding specifically.)	Motilium	Prolactin releaser	Oral	30–80 mg/day (Note: Administered in divided doses.)

In individuals who have not undergone orchiectomy (surgical removal of the testes) or sex reassignment surgery, the doses of estrogens used in transgender women are often higher than replacement doses used in cisgender women. This is to help suppress testosterone levels. The Endocrine Society (2017) recommends maintaining estradiol levels roughly within the normal average range for premenopausal women of about 100 to 200 pg/mL. However, it notes that these physiological levels of estradiol are usually unable to suppress testosterone levels into the female range. A 2018 Cochrane review proposal questioned the notion of keeping estradiol levels lower in transgender women, which results in incomplete suppression of testosterone levels and necessitates the addition of antiandrogens. The review proposal noted that high-dose parenteral estradiol is known to be safe. The Endocrine Society itself recommends dosages of injected estradiol esters that result in estradiol levels markedly in excess of the normal female range, for instance 10 mg per week estradiol valerate by intramuscular injection. A single such injection results in estradiol levels of about 1,250 pg/mL at peak and levels of around 200 pg/mL after 7 days. Dosages of estrogens can be reduced after an orchiectomy or sex reassignment surgery, when gonadal testosterone suppression is no longer needed.

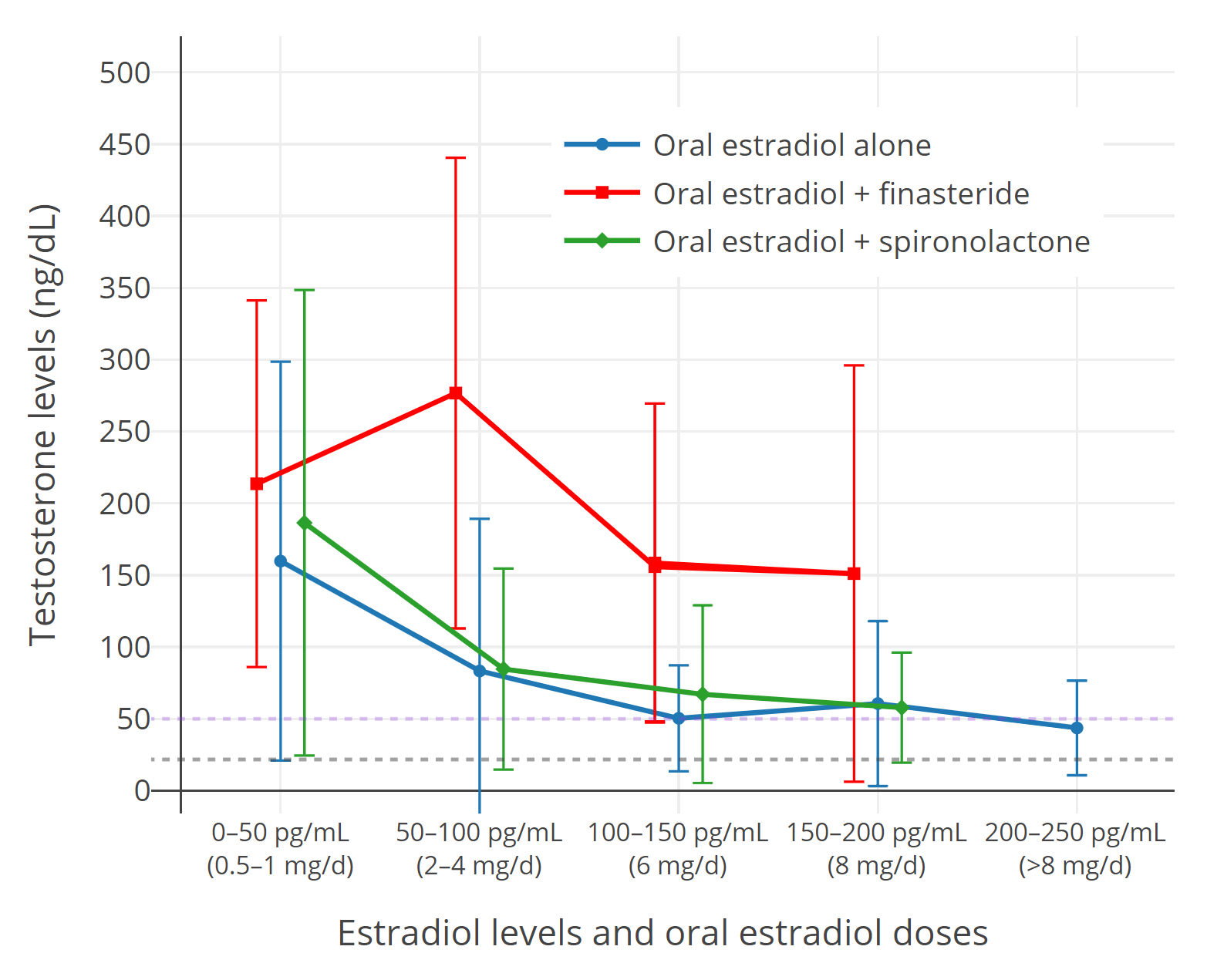
Testosterone levels in relation to estradiol levels (and corresponding estradiol dosages) during therapy with oral estradiol alone or in combination with an antiandrogen in transgender women. The dashed purple line is the upper limit for the female/castrate range (~50 ng/dL) and the dashed grey line is the testosterone level in a comparison group of post-operative transgender women (21.7 ng/dL).

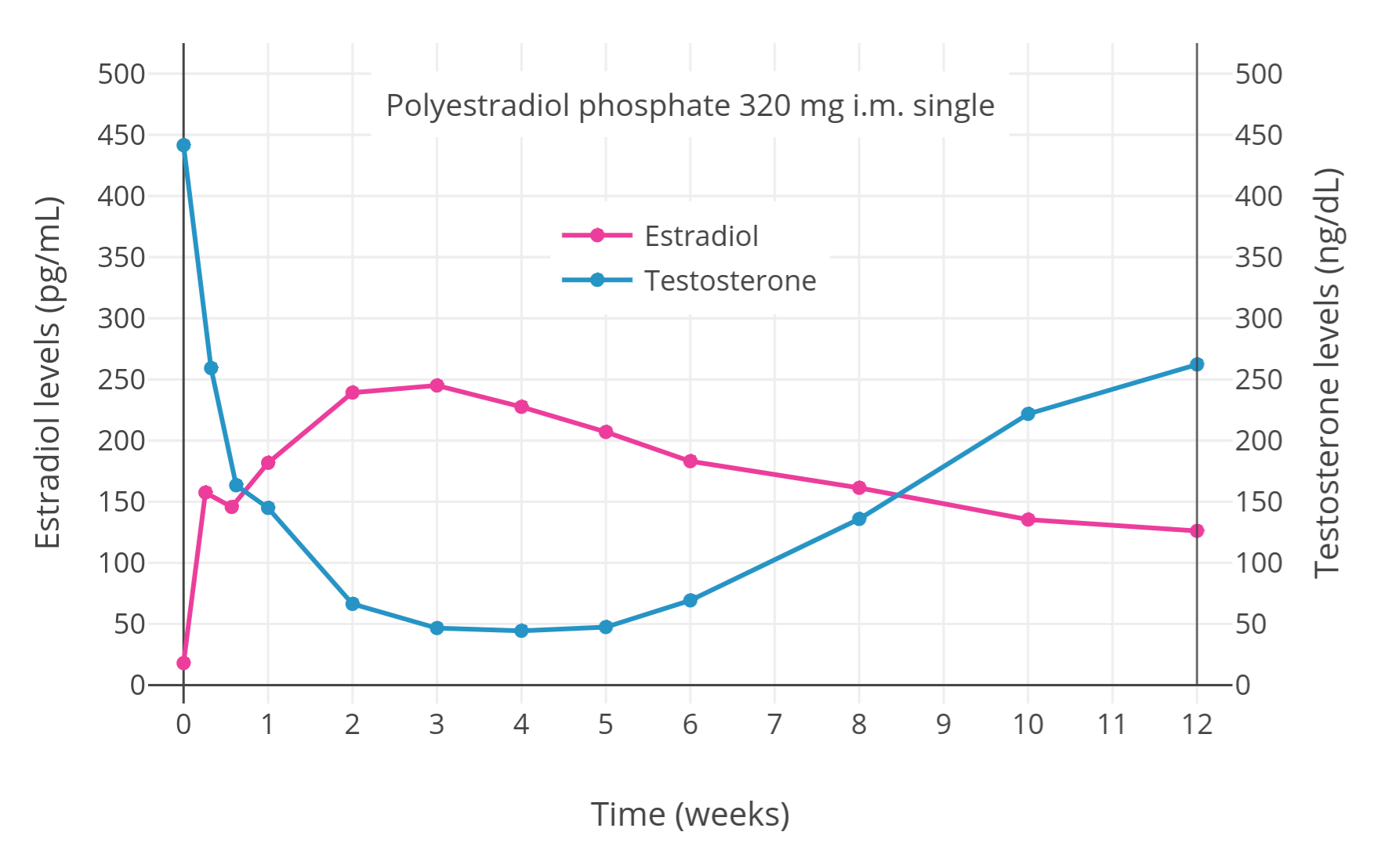
Estradiol and testosterone levels over 12 weeks after a single intramuscular injection of 320 mg polyestradiol phosphate, a polymeric estradiol ester and prodrug, in men with prostate cancer. Demonstrates the suppression of testosterone levels by parenteral estradiol.

=== Antiandrogens ===
Antiandrogens are medications that prevent the effects of androgens in the body. Androgens, such as testosterone and dihydrotestosterone (DHT), are the major sex hormones in individuals with testes, and are responsible for the development and maintenance of masculine secondary sex characteristics, such as a deep voice, broad shoulders, and a masculine pattern of hair, muscle, and fat distribution. In addition, androgens stimulate sex drive and the frequency of spontaneous erections and are responsible for acne, body odor, and androgen-dependent scalp hair loss. Androgens also have functional antiestrogenic effects in the breasts and oppose estrogen-mediated breast development, even at low levels. Androgens act by binding to and activating the androgen receptor, their biological target in the body. Antiandrogens work by blocking androgens from binding to the androgen receptor and/or by inhibiting or suppressing the production of androgens.

Antiandrogens that directly block the androgen receptor are known as androgen receptor antagonists or blockers, while antiandrogens that inhibit the enzymatic biosynthesis of androgens are known as androgen synthesis inhibitors and antiandrogens that suppress androgen production in the gonads are known as antigonadotropins. Estrogens and progestogens are antigonadotropins and hence are functional antiandrogens. The purpose of the use of antiandrogens in transgender women is to block or suppress residual testosterone that is not suppressed by estrogens alone. Additional antiandrogen therapy is not necessarily required if testosterone levels are in the normal female range or if the person has undergone orchiectomy. However, individuals with testosterone levels in the normal female range and with persisting androgen-dependent skin and/or hair symptoms, such as acne, seborrhea, oily skin, or scalp hair loss, can potentially still benefit from the addition of an antiandrogen, as antiandrogens can reduce or eliminate such symptoms.

==== Steroidal antiandrogens ====
Steroidal antiandrogens are antiandrogens that resemble steroid hormones like testosterone and progesterone in chemical structure. They are the most commonly used antiandrogens in transgender women. Spironolactone (Aldactone), which is relatively safe and inexpensive, is the most frequently used antiandrogen in the United States. Cyproterone acetate (Androcur), which is unavailable in the United States, is widely used in Europe, Canada, and the rest of the world. Medroxyprogesterone acetate (Provera, Depo-Provera), a similar medication, is sometimes used in place of cyproterone acetate in the United States.

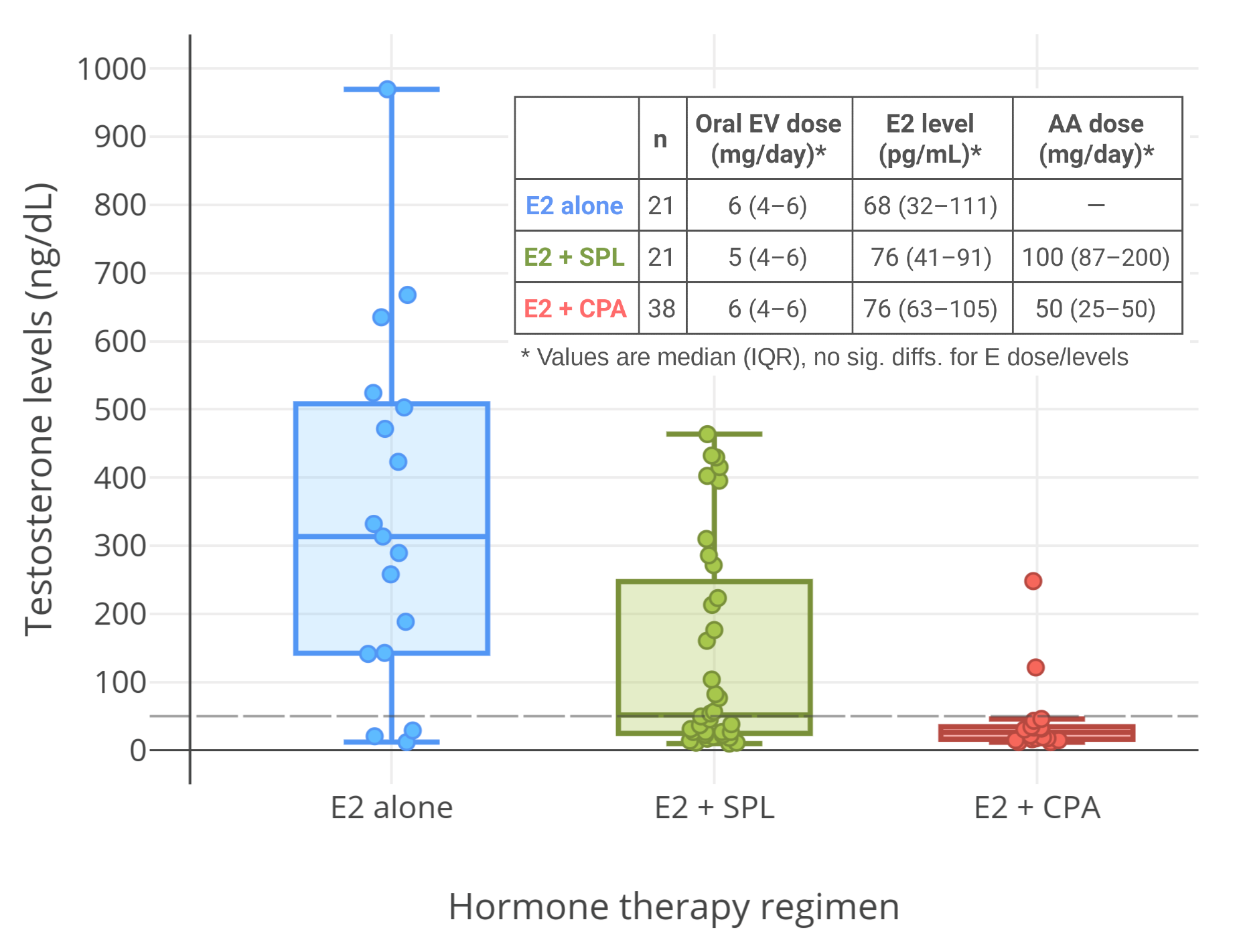
Testosterone levels with estradiol (E2) alone or in combination with an antiandrogen (AA) in the form of spironolactone (SPL) or cyproterone acetate (CPA) in transfeminine people. Estradiol was used in the form of oral estradiol valerate (EV) in almost all cases. The dashed horizontal line is the upper limit of the female/castrate range (~50 ng/dL).

Spironolactone is an antimineralocorticoid (antagonist of the mineralocorticoid receptor) and potassium-sparing diuretic, which is mainly used to treat high blood pressure, edema, high aldosterone levels, and low potassium levels caused by other diuretics, among other uses. Spironolactone is an antiandrogen as a secondary and originally unintended action. It works as an antiandrogen mainly by acting as an androgen receptor antagonist. The medication is also a weak steroidogenesis inhibitor, and inhibits the enzymatic synthesis of androgens. However, this action is of low potency, and spironolactone has mixed and inconsistent effects on hormone levels. In any case, testosterone levels are usually unchanged by spironolactone. Studies in transgender women have found testosterone levels to be unaltered with spironolactone or to be decreased. Spironolactone is described as a relatively weak antiandrogen. It is widely used in the treatment of acne, excessive hair growth, and hyperandrogenism in women, who have much lower testosterone levels than men. Because of its antimineralocorticoid activity, spironolactone has antimineralocorticoid side effects and can cause high potassium levels. Hospitalization and/or death can potentially result from high potassium levels due to spironolactone, but the risk of high potassium levels in people taking spironolactone appears to be minimal in those without risk factors for it. As such, monitoring of potassium levels may not be necessary in most cases. Spironolactone has been found to decrease the bioavailability of high doses of oral estradiol. Although widely employed, the use of spironolactone as an antiandrogen in transgender women has recently been questioned due to the various shortcomings of the medication for such purposes.

Cyproterone acetate is an antiandrogen and progestin which is used in the treatment of numerous androgen-dependent conditions and is also used as a progestogen in birth control pills. It works primarily as an antigonadotropin, secondarily to its potent progestogenic activity, and strongly suppresses gonadal androgen production. Cyproterone acetate at a dosage of 5 to 10 mg/day has been found to lower testosterone levels in men by about 50 to 70%, while a dosage of 100 mg/day has been found to lower testosterone levels in men by about 75%. The combination of 25 mg/day cyproterone acetate and a moderate dosage of estradiol has been found to suppress testosterone levels in transgender women by about 95%. In combination with estrogen, 10, 25, and 50 mg/day cyproterone acetate have all shown the same degree of testosterone suppression. In addition to its actions as an antigonadotropin, cyproterone acetate is an androgen receptor antagonist. However, this action is relatively insignificant at low dosages, and is more important at the high doses of cyproterone acetate that are used in the treatment of prostate cancer (100–300 mg/day). Cyproterone acetate can cause elevated liver enzymes and liver damage, including liver failure. However, this occurs mostly in prostate cancer patients who take very high doses of cyproterone acetate; liver toxicity has not been reported in transgender women. Cyproterone acetate also has a variety of other adverse effects, such as fatigue and weight gain, and risks, such as blood clots and benign brain tumors, among others. High dosages of cyproterone-based medication have been linked with meningioma. Periodic monitoring of liver enzymes and prolactin levels may be advisable during cyproterone acetate therapy.

Medroxyprogesterone acetate is a progestin that is related to cyproterone acetate and is sometimes used as an alternative to it. It is specifically used as an alternative to cyproterone acetate in the United States, where cyproterone acetate is not approved for medical use and is unavailable. Medroxyprogesterone acetate suppresses testosterone levels in transgender women similarly to cyproterone acetate. Oral medroxyprogesterone acetate has been found to suppress testosterone levels in men by about 30 to 75% across a dosage range of 20 to 100 mg/day. In contrast to cyproterone acetate however, medroxyprogesterone acetate is not also an androgen receptor antagonist. Medroxyprogesterone acetate has similar side effects and risks as cyproterone acetate, but is not associated with liver problems.

Numerous other progestogens and by extension antigonadotropins have been used to suppress testosterone levels in men and are likely useful for such purposes in transgender women as well. Progestogens alone are in general able to suppress testosterone levels in men by a maximum of about 70 to 80%, or to just above female/castrate levels when used at sufficiently high doses. The combination of a sufficient dosage of a progestogen with very small doses of an estrogen (e.g., as little as 0.5–1.5 mg/day oral estradiol) is synergistic in terms of antigonadotropic effect and is able to fully suppress gonadal testosterone production, reducing testosterone levels to the female/castrate range.

==== Nonsteroidal antiandrogens ====
Nonsteroidal antiandrogens are antiandrogens which are nonsteroidal and hence unrelated to steroid hormones in terms of chemical structure. These medications are primarily used in the treatment of prostate cancer, but are also used for other purposes such as the treatment of acne, excessive facial/body hair growth, and high androgen levels in women. Unlike steroidal antiandrogens, nonsteroidal antiandrogens are highly selective for the androgen receptor and act as pure androgen receptor antagonists. Similarly to spironolactone however, they do not lower androgen levels, and instead work exclusively by preventing androgens from activating the androgen receptor. Nonsteroidal antiandrogens are more efficacious androgen receptor antagonists than are steroidal antiandrogens, and for this reason, in conjunction with GnRH modulators, have largely replaced steroidal antiandrogens in the treatment of prostate cancer.

The nonsteroidal antiandrogens that have been used in transgender women include the first-generation medications flutamide (Eulexin), nilutamide (Anandron, Nilandron), and bicalutamide (Casodex). Newer and even more efficacious second-generation nonsteroidal antiandrogens like enzalutamide (Xtandi), apalutamide (Erleada), and darolutamide (Nubeqa) also exist, but are very expensive due to generics being unavailable and have not been used in transgender women. Flutamide and nilutamide have relatively high toxicity, including considerable risks of liver damage and lung disease. Due to its risks, the use of flutamide in cisgender and transgender women is now limited and discouraged. Flutamide and nilutamide have largely been superseded by bicalutamide in clinical practice, with bicalutamide accounting for almost 90% of nonsteroidal antiandrogen prescriptions in the United States by the mid-2000s. Bicalutamide is said to have excellent tolerability and safety relative to flutamide and nilutamide, as well as in comparison to cyproterone acetate. It has few to no side effects in women. Despite its greatly improved tolerability and safety profile however, bicalutamide does still have a small risk of elevated liver enzymes and association with rare cases of serious liver damage and lung disease.

Nonsteroidal antiandrogens like bicalutamide may be a particularly favorable option for transgender women who wish to preserve sex drive, sexual function, and/or fertility, relative to antiandrogens that suppress testosterone levels and can greatly disrupt these functions such as cyproterone acetate and GnRH modulators. However, estrogens suppress testosterone levels and at high doses can markedly disrupt sex drive and function and fertility on their own. Moreover, disruption of gonadal function and fertility by estrogens may be permanent after extended exposure.

==== GnRH modulators ====
GnRH modulators are antigonadotropins and hence functional antiandrogens. In both males and females, gonadotropin-releasing hormone (GnRH) is produced in the hypothalamus and induces the secretion of the gonadotropins luteinizing hormone (LH) and follicle-stimulating hormone (FSH) from the pituitary gland. The gonadotropins signal the gonads to make sex hormones such as testosterone and estradiol. GnRH modulators bind to and inhibit the GnRH receptor, thereby preventing gonadotropin release. As a result of this, GnRH modulators are able to completely shut-down gonadal sex hormone production, and can decrease testosterone levels in men and transgender women by about 95%, or to an equivalent extent as surgical castration. GnRH modulators are also commonly known as GnRH analogues. However, not all clinically used GnRH modulators are analogues of GnRH.

There are two types of GnRH modulators: GnRH agonists and GnRH antagonists. These medications have the opposite action on the GnRH receptor but paradoxically have the same therapeutic effects. GnRH agonists, such as leuprorelin (Lupron), goserelin (Zoladex), and buserelin (Suprefact), are GnRH receptor superagonists, and work by producing profound desensitization of the GnRH receptor such that the receptor becomes non-functional. This occurs because GnRH is normally released in pulses, but GnRH agonists are continuously present, and this results in excessive downregulation of the receptor and ultimately a complete loss of function. At the initiation of treatment, GnRH agonists are associated with a "flare" effect on hormone levels due to acute overstimulation of the GnRH receptor. In men, LH levels increase by up to 800%, while testosterone levels increase to about 140 to 200% of baseline. Gradually however, the GnRH receptor desensitizes; testosterone levels peak after about 2 to 4 days, return to baseline after about 7 to 8 days, and are reduced to castrate levels within 2 to 4 weeks. Antigonadotropins such as estrogens and cyproterone acetate as well as nonsteroidal antiandrogens such as flutamide and bicalutamide can be used beforehand and concomitantly to reduce or prevent the effects of the testosterone flare caused by GnRH agonists. In contrast to GnRH agonists, GnRH antagonists, such as degarelix (Firmagon) and elagolix (Orilissa), work by binding to the GnRH receptor without activating it, thereby displacing GnRH from the receptor and preventing its activation. Unlike with GnRH agonists, there is no initial surge effect with GnRH antagonists; the therapeutic effects are immediate, with sex hormone levels being reduced to castrate levels within a few days.

GnRH modulators are highly effective for testosterone suppression in transgender women and have few or no side effects when sex hormone deficiency is avoided with concomitant estrogen therapy. However, GnRH modulators tend to be very expensive (typically US$10,000 to US$15,000 per year in the United States), and are often denied by medical insurance. Because of their costs, many transgender women cannot afford GnRH modulators and must use other, often less effective options for testosterone suppression. However, in countries with publicly funded health care, such as France, they are becoming more common: they are for instance prescribed as standard practice for transgender women in the United Kingdom, where the National Health Service (NHS) covers them. This is in contrast to the United States. Another drawback of GnRH modulators is that most of them are peptides and are not orally active, requiring administration by injection, implant, or nasal spray. However, non-peptide and orally active GnRH antagonists, elagolix (Orilissa) and relugolix (Relumina), were introduced for medical use in 2018 and 2019, respectively. But they are under patent protection and, as with other GnRH modulators, are very expensive at present.

In adolescents of either sex, GnRH modulators can be used to suppress puberty. The eighth edition of the World Professional Association for Transgender Health's Standards of Care permit its use from Tanner stage 2 and recommends GnRH agonists as the preferred method of puberty blocking.

==== 5α-Reductase inhibitors ====
5α-Reductase inhibitors are inhibitors of the enzyme 5α-reductase, and are a type of specific androgen synthesis inhibitor. 5α-Reductase is an enzyme that is responsible for the conversion of testosterone into the more potent androgen dihydrotestosterone (DHT). There are three different isoforms of 5α-reductase, types 1, 2, and 3, and these three isoforms show different patterns of expression in the body. Relative to testosterone, DHT is about 2.5- to 10-fold more potent as an agonist of the androgen receptor. As such, 5α-reductase serves to considerably potentiate the effects of testosterone. However, 5α-reductase is expressed only in specific tissues, such as skin, hair follicles, and the prostate gland, and for this reason, conversion of testosterone into DHT happens only in certain parts of the body. Furthermore, circulating levels of total and free DHT in men are very low at about one-tenth and one-twentieth those of testosterone, respectively, and DHT is efficiently inactivated into weak androgens in various tissues such as muscle, fat, and liver. As such, it is thought that DHT plays little role as a systemic androgen hormone and serves more as a means of locally potentiating the androgenic effects of testosterone in a tissue-specific manner. Conversion of testosterone into DHT by 5α-reductase plays an important role in male reproductive system development and maintenance (specifically of the penis, scrotum, prostate gland, and seminal vesicles), male-pattern facial/body hair growth, and scalp hair loss, but has little role in other aspects of masculinization. Besides the involvement of 5α-reductase in androgen signaling, it is also required for the conversion of steroid hormones such as progesterone and testosterone into neurosteroids like allopregnanolone and 3α-androstanediol, respectively.

5α-Reductase inhibitors include finasteride and dutasteride. Finasteride is a selective inhibitor of 5α-reductase types 2 and 3, while dutasteride is an inhibitor of all three isoforms of 5α-reductase. Finasteride can decrease circulating DHT levels by up to 70%, whereas dutasteride can decrease circulating DHT levels by up to 99%. Conversely, 5α-reductase inhibitors do not decrease testosterone levels, and may actually increase them slightly. 5α-Reductase inhibitors are used primarily in the treatment of benign prostatic hyperplasia, a condition in which the prostate gland becomes excessively large due to stimulation by DHT and causes unpleasant urogenital symptoms. They are also used in the treatment of androgen-dependent scalp hair loss in men and women. The medications are able to prevent further scalp hair loss in men and can restore some scalp hair density. Conversely, the effectiveness of 5α-reductase inhibitors in the treatment of scalp hair loss in women is less clear. This may be because androgen levels are much lower in women, in whom they may not play as important of a role in scalp hair loss. 5α-Reductase inhibitors are also used to treat hirsutism (excessive body/facial hair growth) in women, and are very effective for this indication. Dutasteride has been found to be significantly more effective than finasteride in the treatment of scalp hair loss in men, which has been attributed to its more complete inhibition of 5α-reductase and by extension decrease in DHT production. In addition to their antiandrogenic uses, 5α-reductase inhibitors have been found to reduce adverse affective symptoms in premenstrual dysphoric disorder in women. This is thought to be due to prevention by 5α-reductase inhibitors of the conversion of progesterone into allopregnanolone during the luteal phase of the menstrual cycle.

5α-Reductase inhibitors are sometimes used as a component of feminizing hormone therapy for transgender women in combination with estrogens and/or other antiandrogens. They may have beneficial effects limited to improvement of scalp hair loss, body hair growth, and possibly skin symptoms such as acne. However, little clinical research on 5α-reductase inhibitors in transgender women has been conducted, and evidence of their efficacy and safety in this group is limited. Moreover, 5α-reductase inhibitors have only mild and specific antiandrogenic activity, and are not recommended as general antiandrogens.

5α-Reductase inhibitors have minimal side effects and are well tolerated in both men and women. In men, the most common side effect is sexual dysfunction (0.9–15.8% incidence), which may include decreased libido, erectile dysfunction, and reduced ejaculate. Another side effect in men is breast changes, such as breast tenderness and gynecomastia (2.8% incidence). Due to decreased levels of androgens and/or neurosteroids, 5α-reductase inhibitors may slightly increase the risk of depression (~2.0% incidence). There are reports that a small percentage of men may experience persistent sexual dysfunction and adverse mood changes even after discontinuation of 5α-reductase inhibitors. Some of the possible side effects of 5α-reductase inhibitors in men, such as gynecomastia and sexual dysfunction, are actually welcome changes for many transgender women. In any case, caution may be warranted in using 5α-reductase inhibitors in transgender women, as this group is already at a high risk for depression and suicidality.

=== Progestogens ===
Progesterone, a progestogen, is the other of the two major sex hormones in women. It is mainly involved in the regulation of the female reproductive system, the menstrual cycle, pregnancy, and lactation. The non-reproductive effects of progesterone are fairly insignificant. Unlike estrogens, progesterone is not known to be involved in the development of female secondary sexual characteristics, and hence is not believed to contribute to feminization in women. One area of particular interest in terms of the effects of progesterone in women is breast development. Estrogens are responsible for the development of the ductal and connective tissues of the breasts and the deposition of fat into the breasts during puberty in girls. Conversely, high levels of progesterone, in conjunction with other hormones such as prolactin, are responsible for the lobuloalveolar maturation of the mammary glands during pregnancy. This allows for lactation and breastfeeding after childbirth. Although progesterone causes the breasts to change during pregnancy, the breasts undergo involution and revert to their pre-pregnancy composition and size after the cessation of breastfeeding. Every pregnancy, lobuloalveolar maturation occurs again anew.

There are two types of progestogens: progesterone, which is the natural and bioidentical hormone in the body; and progestins, which are synthetic progestogens. There are dozens of clinically used progestins. Certain progestins, namely cyproterone acetate and medroxyprogesterone acetate and as described previously, are used at high doses as functional antiandrogens due to their antigonadotropic effects to help suppress testosterone levels in transgender women. Aside from the specific use of testosterone suppression however, there are no other indications of progestogens in transgender women at present. In relation to this, the use of progestogens in transgender women is controversial, and they are not otherwise routinely prescribed or recommended. Besides progesterone, cyproterone acetate, and medroxyprogesterone acetate, other progestogens that have been reported to have been used in transgender women include hydroxyprogesterone caproate, dydrogesterone, norethisterone acetate, and drospirenone. Progestins in general largely have the same progestogenic effects however, and in theory, any progestin could be used in transgender women.

Clinical research on the use of progestogens in transgender women is very limited. Some patients and clinicians believe, on the basis of anecdotal and subjective claims, that progestogens may provide benefits such as improved breast and/or nipple development, mood, and libido in transgender women. There are no clinical studies to support such reports at present. No clinical study has assessed the use of progesterone in transgender women, and only a couple of studies have compared the use of progestins (specifically cyproterone acetate and medroxyprogesterone acetate) versus the use of no progestogen in transgender women. These studies, albeit limited in the quality of their findings, reported no benefit of progestogens on breast development in transgender women. This has also been the case in limited clinical experience.

Progestogens have some antiestrogenic effects in the breasts, for instance decreasing expression of the estrogen receptor and increasing expression of estrogen-metabolizing enzymes, and for this reason, have been used to treat breast pain and benign breast disorders. Progesterone levels during female puberty do not normally increase importantly until near the end of puberty in cisgender girls, a point by which most breast development has already been completed. In addition, concern has been expressed that premature exposure to progestogens during the process of breast development is unphysiological and might compromise final breast growth outcome, although this notion presently remains theoretical. Though the role of progestogens in pubertal breast development is uncertain, progesterone is essential for lobuloalveolar maturation of the mammary glands during pregnancy. Hence, progestogens are required for any transgender woman who wishes to lactate or breastfeed. A study found full lobuloalveolar maturation of the mammary glands on histological examination in transgender women treated with an estrogen and high-dose cyproterone acetate. However, lobuloalveolar development reversed with discontinuation of cyproterone acetate, indicating that continued progestogen exposure is necessary to maintain the tissue.

In terms of the effects of progestogens on sex drive, one study assessed the use of dydrogesterone to improve sexual desire in transgender women and found no benefit. Another study likewise found that oral progesterone did not improve sexual function in cisgender women.

Progestogens can have adverse effects. Oral progesterone has inhibitory neurosteroid effects and can produce side effects such as sedation, mood changes, and alcohol-like effects. Many progestins have off-target activity, such as androgenic, antiandrogenic, glucocorticoid, and antimineralocorticoid activity, and these activities likewise can contribute unwanted side effects. Furthermore, the addition of a progestin to estrogen therapy has been found to increase the risk of blood clots, cardiovascular disease (e.g., coronary heart disease and stroke), and breast cancer compared to estrogen therapy alone in postmenopausal women. Although it is unknown if these health risks of progestins occur in transgender women similarly, it cannot be ruled out that they do. High-dose progestins increase the risk of benign brain tumors including prolactinomas and meningiomas as well. Because of their potential detrimental effects and lack of supported benefits, some researchers have argued that, aside from the purpose of testosterone suppression, progestogens should not generally be used or advocated in transgender women or should only be used for a limited duration (e.g., 2–3 years). Conversely, other researchers have argued that the risks of progestogens in transgender women are likely minimal, and that in light of potential albeit hypothetical benefits, should be used if desired. In general, some transgender women respond favorably to the effects of progestogens, while others respond negatively. A 2025 study found that 72% of progesterone users were satisfied with progesterone use, and 73.5% would recommend progesterone to others.

Progesterone is most commonly taken orally. However, oral progesterone has very low bioavailability, and produces relatively weak progestogenic effects even at high doses. In accordance, and in contrast to progestins, oral progesterone has no antigonadotropic effects in males even at high doses. Progesterone can also be taken by various parenteral (non-oral) routes, including sublingually, rectally, and by intramuscular or subcutaneous injection. These routes do not have the bioavailability and efficacy issues of oral progesterone, and accordingly, can produce considerable antigonadotropic and other progestogenic effects. Transdermal progesterone is poorly effective, owing to absorption issues. Progestins are usually taken orally. In contrast to progesterone, most progestins have high oral bioavailability, and can produce full progestogenic effects with oral administration. Some progestins, such as medroxyprogesterone acetate and hydroxyprogesterone caproate, are or can be used by intramuscular or subcutaneous injection instead. Almost all progestins, with the exception of dydrogesterone, have antigonadotropic effects.

=== Miscellaneous ===
Galactogogues such as the peripherally selective D_{2} receptor antagonist and prolactin releaser domperidone can be used to induce lactation in transgender women who wish to breastfeed. An extended period of combined estrogen and progestogen therapy is necessary to mature the lobuloalveolar tissue of the breasts before this can be successful. There are several published reports of lactation and/or breastfeeding in transgender women.

The World Professional Association for Transgender Health (WPATH) Standards of Care for the Health of Transgender and Gender Diverse People Version 8 (SOC8), released in September 2022, recommends against therapeutic strategies including supraphysiological estradiol levels (>200 pg/mL), use of progesterone (including rectal progesterone), use of bicalutamide, and monitoring of the ratio of estrone to estradiol. This is due to lack of data to support these approaches in transfeminine people as well as potential risks. The WPATH SOC8 also recommends against the use of 5α-reductase inhibitors such as finasteride in transfeminine people.

== Interactions ==
Many of the medications used in feminizing hormone therapy, such as estradiol, cyproterone acetate, and bicalutamide, are substrates of CYP3A4 and other cytochrome P450 enzymes. As a result, inducers of CYP3A4 and other cytochrome P450 enzymes, such as carbamazepine, phenobarbital, phenytoin, rifampin, rifampicin, and St. John's wort, among others, may decrease circulating levels of these medications and thereby decrease their effects. Conversely, inhibitors of CYP3A4 and other cytochrome P450 enzymes, such as cimetidine, clotrimazole, grapefruit juice, itraconazole, ketoconazole, and ritonavir, among others, may increase circulating levels of these medications and thereby increase their effects. The concomitant use of a cytochrome P450 inducer or inhibitor with feminizing hormone therapy may necessitate medication dosage adjustments.

== Effects ==
The spectrum of effects of hormone therapy in transfeminine people depend on the specific medications and dosages used. In any case, the main effects of hormone therapy in transfeminine people are feminization and demasculinization, and are as follows:

Effects of feminizing hormone therapy in transfeminine people
Effect	Time to expected onset of effect (Note: Estimates represent published and unpublished clinical observations.)	Time to expected maximum effect (Note: Time at which further changes are unlikely at maximum maintained dose. Maximum effects vary widely depending on genetics, body habitus, age, and status of gonad removal. Generally, older individuals with intact gonads may have less feminization overall.)	Permanency if hormone therapy is stopped
Breast development and nipple/areolar enlargement	2–6 months	1–5 years	Surgically reversible
Thinning/slowed growth of facial/body hair	4–12 months	>3 years (Note: Complete removal of male facial and body hair requires electrolysis, laser hair removal, or both. Temporary hair removal can be achieved with shaving, epilating, waxing, and other methods.)	Reversible
Cessation/reversal of male-pattern scalp hair loss	1–3 months	1–2 years (Note: Familial scalp hair loss may occur if estrogens are stopped.)	Reversible
Softening of skin/decreased oiliness and acne	3–6 months	Unknown	Reversible
Redistribution of body fat in a feminine pattern	3–6 months	2–5 years	Reversible
Decreased muscle mass/strength	3–6 months	1–2 years (Note: Varies significantly depending on the amount of physical exercise.)	Reversible
Widening and rounding of the pelvis (Note: Occurs only in individuals of pubertal age who have not yet completed epiphyseal closure.)	Unspecified	Unspecified	Permanent
Changes in mood, emotionality, and behavior	Unspecified	Unspecified	Reversible
Decreased sex drive	1–3 months	Temporary	Reversible
Decreased spontaneous/morning erections	1–3 months	3–6 months	Reversible
Erectile dysfunction and decreased ejaculate volume	1–3 months	Variable	Reversible
Decreased sperm production/fertility	Unknown	>3 years	Reversible or permanent (Note: Additional research is needed to determine permanency, but a permanent impact of estrogen therapy on sperm quality is likely and sperm preservation options should be counseled on and considered before initiation of therapy.)
Decreased testicle size	3–6 months	2–3 years	Unknown
Decreased penis size	Conflicting reports, with none reported observed in transgender women but significant albeit minor reduction of penis size reported in men with prostate cancer on androgen deprivation therapy.	Not applicable	Not applicable
Decreased prostate gland size	Unspecified	Unspecified	Unspecified
Voice changes	None (Note: Treatment by speech pathologists for voice training is effective.)	Not applicable	Not applicable
Footnotes and sources Footnotes: Sources: Guidelines: Reviews/book chapters: Studies:

=== Mental changes ===
The psychological effects of feminizing hormone therapy are harder to define than physical changes. Because hormone therapy is usually the first physical step taken to transition, the act of beginning it has a significant psychological effect, which is difficult to distinguish from hormonally induced changes.

Changes in mood and well-being occur with hormone therapy in transgender women.

Side effects of hormone therapy have the ability to significantly impact sexual functioning, either directly or indirectly through the various side effects, such as cerebrovascular disorders, obesity, and mood fluctuations. Some transgender women report a significant reduction in libido, depending on the dosage of antiandrogens. The effects of long-term hormonal regimens have not been conclusively studied and are difficult to estimate because research on the long-term use of hormonal therapy has not been noted. One study found that sex drive returned to baseline after three years of hormone therapy. It is possible to approximate outcomes of these therapies on transgender people based on their observed effect in cisgender men and women. Firstly, if one is to decrease testosterone in feminizing gender transition, it is likely that sexual desire and arousal would be inhibited; alternatively, if high doses of estrogen negatively impact sexual desire, which has been found in some research with cisgender women, it is hypothesized that combining androgens with high levels of estrogen would intensify this outcome. To date there have not been any randomized clinical trials looking at the relationship between type and dose of transgender hormone therapy, so the relationship between them remains unclear. Typically, the estrogens given for feminizing gender transition are 2 to 3 times higher than the recommended dose for HRT in postmenopausal women. Pharmacokinetic studies indicate taking these increased doses may lead to a higher boost in plasma estradiol levels; however, the long-term side effects have not been studied and the safety of this route is unclear.

Several studies have found that hormone therapy in transgender women causes the structure of the brain to change in the direction of female proportions. In addition, studies have found that hormone therapy in transgender women causes performance in cognitive tasks, including visuospatial, verbal memory, and verbal fluency, to shift in a more female direction.

=== Fat distribution ===
In hormone therapy, trans women often experience slight weight gain as men generally carry higher levels of visceral fat compared to subcutaneous fat, and less fat overall compared to cisgender women. Over months and years, HRT causes the body to accumulate new fat in a feminine pattern (gynoid fat). Unlike abdominal fat, gynoid fat has little effect on overall health except in the case of severe excess or postural changes. Gynoid fat will accumulate in the hips, lower belly, thighs, buttocks, pubis, upper arms, and breasts while the body burns fat in the ribcage, upper waist, shoulders, and back. However, fat will not simply move from one spot to another. There must be sufficient caloric intake to deposit gynoid fat, and sufficient activity to burn android fat.

=== Breast development ===
Breasts of a transgender woman induced by feminizing hormone therapy.

Significant breast development in transgender women begins within two to three months of the start of hormone therapy and continues for up to two years or more. Breast development seems to be better in transgender women who have a higher body mass index. This indicates that weight gain in the early phases of hormone therapy may be beneficial not only for fat distribution, but for breast development. Different estrogens, such as estradiol valerate, conjugated estrogens, and ethinylestradiol, appear to produce equivalent results in terms of breast sizes in transgender women. The sudden discontinuation of estrogen therapy has been associated with onset of galactorrhea (lactation).

Breast, nipple, and areolar development varies considerably depending on genetics, nutrition, age of HRT initiation, and many other factors. Development can take a couple years to nearly a decade for some. However, many transgender women report there is often a "stall" in breast growth during transition, or significant breast asymmetry. Transgender women on HRT often experience less breast development than cisgender women (especially if started after young adulthood). For this reason, many seek breast augmentation. Transgender patients opting for breast reduction are rare. Shoulder width and the size of the rib cage also play a role in the perceivable size of the breasts; both are usually larger in transgender women, causing the breasts to appear proportionally smaller. Thus, when a transgender woman opts to have breast augmentation, the implants used tend to be larger than those used by cisgender women.

=== Fertility ===
The effect of feminizing hormone therapy on fertility is not clear, but it is known that testosterone suppression can prevent sperm production. The age of starting and stopping hormone therapy seems to be a significant factor, but no direct causation has been found between length of treatment and ability to reproduce.

There is some research showing effective restoration of fertility by alternative means than HRT cessation alone. Will Powers has demonstrated the effectiveness of clomifene in restoring spermatogenesis in trans women. His study also includes an in-depth description of other methods for fertility restoration.

=== Skin ===
Estrogens cause the accumulation of subcutaneous fat and an increased epidermal thickness, softening the skin. Some skin conditions, including melasma, are found in trans women at the same rate at cisgender women. Body odor and sweat patterns are changed by feminizing hormone therapy, while sebaceous gland activity lessens, reducing oil production on the skin and scalp. Consequently, the skin becomes less prone to acne. It also becomes drier, and lotions or oils may be necessary.

=== Skeleton ===
Sex hormones play an important role in bone growth and maintenance. The effects of hormone therapy on bone health are not fully understood, and may depend on whether hormone therapy is started before or after puberty. Bone density continue to grow and change over time.

Significant changes to bone structure have been observed, and transgender women have statistically poorer bone health even before beginning the transition process, possibly due to a lack of physical exercise or other risk factors such as low vitamin D, eating disorders, and substance abuse.

Approximately 14% of transgender women suffer from osteoporosis. Transgender women below the age of 50 show increased fracture risk compared to age-matched cisgender women, equal to the risk to cisgender men of equivalent age. Transgender women above the age of 50 have a similar fracture risk to post-menopausal women — higher than that of age-matched cis men. In both cases, trans women's fracture patterns follow that of cis women, suffering long-term stress fractures concentrated in the hip, spine, and arms, typical of chronic low bone mineral density, rather than the fracture patterns typical of external injury suffered by cis men. Current clinical guidelines are for bone health to be monitored regularly throughout the transition process, particularly if risk factors are present. Transgender individuals are encouraged to ingest at least 1g of Calcium and 1000 IU of Vitamin D daily, engage regularly in weight-bearing physical activity, and reduce alcohol and smoking consumption.

The effects of hormone therapy on bone health are reversible should treatment be interrupted. However, withdrawing hormone therapy after gonadectomy can lead to bone loss, and poor compliance with prescribed hormone therapy after gonadectomy may account in part for the observed fracture risk.

=== Hair ===
As male-pattern hair loss is caused by androgens, particularly dihydrotestosterone, feminizing hormone therapy causes the rapid cessation and reversal of hair loss, though the degree of regrowth may vary. In many cases, the use of estrogens and antiandrogens have a more profound impact on hair loss compared to treatments used in men such as finasteride due to the greater suppression of dihydrotestosterone. Occasionally, hormones can also have effects on scalp hair texture, depending on various genetic factors.

Antiandrogens affect existing facial hair only slightly; patients may see slower growth and some reduction in density and coverage. This reduction of density is due to the decreasing hair diameter and slower terminal growth rate. Effects on hair size and density were noticeable in the first four months following the start of hormone therapy, but later subsided, with measurements staying constant. In patients in their teens or early twenties, antiandrogens prevent new facial hair from developing if testosterone levels are within the normal female range.

Body hair (on the chest, shoulders, back, abdomen, buttocks, thighs, tops of hands, and tops of feet) turns, over time, from terminal ("normal") hairs to tiny, blonde vellus hairs. Arm, perianal, and perineal hair is reduced but may not turn to vellus hair on the latter two regions (some cisgender women also have hair in these areas). Underarm hair changes slightly in texture and length, and pubic hair becomes more typically female in pattern. Lower leg hair becomes less dense. All of these changes depend to some degree on genetics. Eyebrows do not change because they are not androgenic hair.

=== Eye morphology ===
The lens of the eye changes in curvature. Because of decreased androgen levels, the meibomian glands (the sebaceous glands on the upper and lower eyelids that open up at the edges) produce less oil. Because oil prevents the tear film from evaporating, this change may cause dry eyes.

=== Cardiovascular effects ===
The most significant cardiovascular risk for transgender women is the prothrombotic effect (increased blood clotting) of estrogens. This manifests most significantly as an increased risk for venous thromboembolism (VTE): deep vein thrombosis (DVT) and pulmonary embolism (PE), which occurs when blood clots from DVT break off and migrate to the lungs. Symptoms of DVT include pain or swelling of one leg, especially the calf. Symptoms of PE include chest pain, shortness of breath, fainting, and heart palpitations, sometimes without leg pain or swelling.

VTE occurs more frequently in the first year of treatment with estrogens. The risk of VTE is higher with oral non-bioidentical estrogens such as ethinylestradiol and conjugated estrogens than with parenteral formulations of estradiol such as injectable, transdermal, implantable, and intranasal. Increased risk of VTE with estrogens is thought to be due to their influence on liver protein synthesis, specifically on the production of coagulation factors. Non-bioidentical estrogens such as conjugated estrogens and especially ethinylestradiol have markedly disproportionate effects on liver protein synthesis relative to estradiol. In addition, oral estradiol has a 4- to 5-fold increased impact on liver protein synthesis than does transdermal estradiol and other parenteral estradiol routes.

Because the risks of warfarin – which is used to treat blood clots – in a relatively young and otherwise healthy population are low, while the risk of adverse physical and psychological outcomes for untreated transgender patients is high, prothrombotic mutations (such as factor V Leiden, antithrombin III, and protein C or S deficiency) are not absolute contraindications for hormonal therapy.

A 2018 cohort study of 2842 transfeminine individuals in the United States treated with a mean follow-up of 4.0 years observed an increased risk of VTE, stroke, and heart attack relative to a cisgender reference population. The estrogens used included oral estradiol (1 to 10 mg/day) and other estrogen formulations. Other medications such as antiandrogens like spironolactone were also used.

A 2025 Dutch retrospective cohort study reported lower or similar risks for arterial cardiovascular events, but an elevated risk of venous thromboembolism. In 2,714 transgender women receiving gender-affirming hormone therapy, with 23,907 person-years of follow-up during the observation period, the study found that after adjustment for socioeconomic status, transgender women had a lower risk of myocardial infarction, a similar risk of ischaemic cerebrovascular accident, and a higher risk of venous thromboembolism compared with general-population men.

A 2019 systematic review and meta-analysis found an incidence rate of VTE of 2.3 per 1000 person-years with feminizing hormone therapy in transgender women. For comparison, the rate in the general population has been found to be 1.0–1.8 per 1000 person-years, and the rate in premenopausal women taking birth control pills has been found to be 3.5 per 1000 patient-years. There was significant heterogeneity in the rates of VTE across the included studied, and the meta-analysis was unable to perform subgroup analyses between estrogen type, estrogen route, estrogen dosage, concomitant antiandrogen or progestogen use, or patient characteristics (e.g., sex, age, smoking status, weight) corresponding to known risk factors for VTE. Due to the inclusion of some studies using ethinylestradiol, which is more thrombotic and is no longer used in transgender women, the researchers noted that the VTE risk found in their study may be an overestimate.

In a 2016 study that specifically assessed oral estradiol, the incidence of VTE in 676 transgender women who were treated for an average of 1.9 years each was one individual, or 0.15% of the group, with an incidence of 7.8 events per 10,000 person-years. The dosage of oral estradiol used was 2 to 8 mg/day. Almost all of the transgender women were also taking spironolactone (94%), a subset were also taking finasteride (17%), and fewer than 5% were also taking a progestogen (usually oral progesterone). The findings of this study suggest that the incidence of VTE is low in transgender women taking oral estradiol.

Cardiovascular health in transgender women has been reviewed in recent publications.

=== Gastrointestinal ===
Estrogens may increase the risk of gallbladder disease, especially in older and obese people.

=== Cancer risk ===
Studies are mixed on whether the risk of breast cancer is increased with hormone therapy in transgender women. Two cohort studies found no increase in risk relative to cisgender men, whereas another cohort study found an almost 50-fold increase in risk such that the incidence of breast cancer was between that of cisgender men and cisgender women. There is no evidence that breast cancer risk in transgender women is greater than in cisgender women. Twenty cases of breast cancer in transgender women have been reported as of 2019.

Cisgender men with gynecomastia have not been found to have an increased risk of breast cancer. It has been suggested that a 46,XY karyotype (one X chromosome and one Y chromosome) may be protective against breast cancer compared to having a 46,XX karyotype (two X chromosomes). Men with Klinefelter's syndrome (47,XXY karyotype), which causes hypoandrogenism, hyperestrogenism, and a very high incidence of gynecomastia (80%), have a dramatically (20- to 58-fold) increased risk of breast cancer compared to karyotypical men (46,XY), closer to the rate of karyotypical women (46,XX). The incidences of breast cancer in karyotypical men, men with Klinefelter's syndrome, and karyotypical women are approximately 0.1%, 3%, and 12.5%, respectively. Women with complete androgen insensitivity syndrome (46,XY karyotype) never develop male sex characteristics and have normal and complete female morphology, including breast development, yet have not been reported to develop breast cancer. The risk of breast cancer in women with Turner syndrome (45,XO karyotype) also appears to be significantly decreased, though this could be related to ovarian failure and hypogonadism rather than to genetics.

Prostate cancer is extremely rare in gonadectomized transgender women who have been treated with estrogens for a prolonged period of time. Whereas as many as 70% of men show prostate cancer by their 80s, only a handful of cases of prostate cancer in transgender women have been reported in the literature. As such, and in accordance with the fact that androgens are responsible for the development of prostate cancer, HRT appears to be highly protective against prostate cancer in transgender women.

The risks of certain types of benign brain tumors including meningioma and prolactinoma are increased with hormone therapy in transgender women. These risks have mostly been associated with the use of cyproterone acetate.

Estrogens and progestogens can cause prolactinomas, which are benign, prolactin-secreting tumors of the pituitary gland. Milk discharge from the nipples can be a sign of elevated prolactin levels. If a prolactinoma becomes large enough, it can cause visual changes (especially decreased peripheral vision), headaches, depression or other mood changes, dizziness, nausea, vomiting, and symptoms of pituitary failure, like hypothyroidism.

=== Unaffected characteristics ===
Established changes to the bone structure of the face are also unaffected by HRT. A significant majority of craniofacial changes occur during adolescence. Post-adolescent growth is considerably slower and minimal by comparison.

Facial hair develops during puberty and is only slightly affected by HRT.

A person's voice is unaffected by feminizing hormone therapy. Transgender individuals who have undergone male puberty often opt for vocal training, which can take years of practice to achieve the desired results. Some may also opt for vocal surgery, though surgeons recommend this in addition to vocal training, not as an alternative.

== Monitoring ==
Especially in the early stages of feminizing hormone therapy, blood work is done frequently to assess hormone levels and liver function. The Endocrine Society recommends that patients have blood tests every three months in the first year of HRT for estradiol and testosterone, and that spironolactone, if used, be monitored every two to three months in the first year. Recommended ranges for total estradiol and total testosterone levels include but are not limited to the following:

Target ranges for hormone levels in hormone therapy for transgender women
Source	Place	Estradiol, total	Testosterone, total
Endocrine Society	United States	100–200 pg/mL	<50 ng/dL
World Professional Association for Transgender Health (WPATH)	United States	"[T]estosterone levels [...] below the upper limit of the normal female range and estradiol levels within a premenopausal female range but well below supraphysiologic levels." "[M]aintain levels within physiologic ranges for a patient's desired gender expression (based on goals of full feminization/masculinization)."	
Center of Excellence for Transgender Health (UCSF)	United States	"The interpretation of hormone levels for transgender individuals is not yet evidence based; physiologic hormone levels in non-transgender people are used as reference ranges." "Providers are encouraged to consult with their local lab(s) to obtain hormone level reference ranges for both 'male' and 'female' norms, [which can vary,] and then apply the correct range when interpreting results based on the current hormonal sex, rather than the sex of registration."	
Fenway Health	United States	100–200 pg/mL	<55 ng/dL
Callen-Lorde	United States	"Some guidelines recommend checking estradiol and testosterone levels at baseline and throughout the monitoring of estrogen therapy. We have not found a clinical use for routine hormone levels that justifies the expense. However, we recognize that individual providers may adjust their prescribing and monitoring practices as needed to comply with guidelines or when guided by patient need."	
International Planned Parenthood Federation (IPPF)	United Kingdom	<200 pg/mL	30–100 ng/dL
National Health Service (NHS) Foundation Trusts	United Kingdom	55–160 pg/mL	30–85 ng/dL
Royal College of Psychiatry (RCP)	United Kingdom	80–140 pg/mL	"Well below normal male range"
Vancouver Coastal Health (VCH)	Canada	ND	<1.5 nmol/L
Sources: See template.

The optimal ranges for estrogen apply only to individuals taking estradiol (or an ester of estradiol), and not to those taking synthetic or other non-bioidentical preparations (e.g., conjugated estrogens or ethinylestradiol).

Physicians also recommend broader medical monitoring, including complete blood counts; tests of renal function, liver function, and lipid and glucose metabolism; and monitoring of prolactin levels, body weight, and blood pressure.

If prolactin levels are greater than 100 ng/mL, estrogen therapy should be stopped and prolactin levels should be rechecked after 6 to 8 weeks. If prolactin levels remain high, an MRI scan of the pituitary gland to check for the presence of a prolactinoma should be ordered. Otherwise, estrogen therapy may be restarted at a lower dosage. Cyproterone acetate is particularly associated with elevated prolactin levels, and discontinuation of cyproterone acetate lowers prolactin levels. In contrast to cyproterone acetate, estrogen and spironolactone therapy is not associated with increased prolactin levels.

== History ==
Effective pharmaceutical female sex-hormonal medications, including androgens, estrogens, and progestogens, first became available in the 1920s and 1930s, and might have been prescribed for transitions as early as the late 30s or 40s. The earliest report of hormone therapy in transgender women was published by Danish endocrinologist Christian Hamburger in 1953. One of his patients was Christine Jorgensen, who he had treated starting in 1950. Additional reports of hormone therapy in transgender women were published by Hamburger, the German-American endocrinologist Harry Benjamin, and other researchers in the mid-to-late 1960s. However, Benjamin had several hundred transgender patients under his care by the late 1950s, and had treated transgender women with hormone therapy as early as the late 1940s or early 1950s. In any case, Hamburger is said to be the first to treat transgender women with hormone therapy.

One of the first transgender health clinics was opened in the mid-1960s at the Johns Hopkins School of Medicine. By 1981, there were almost 40 such centers. A review of the hormonal regimens of 20 of the centers was published that year. The first International Symposium on Gender Identity, chaired by Christopher John Dewhurst, was held in London in 1969, and the first medical textbook on transness, titled Transsexualism and Sex Reassignment and edited by Richard Green and John Money, was published by Johns Hopkins University Press in 1969. This textbook included a chapter on hormone therapy written by Christian Hamburger and Harry Benjamin. The Harry Benjamin International Gender Dysphoria Association (HBIGDA), now known as the World Professional Association for Transgender Health (WPATH), was formed in 1979, with the first version of the Standards of Care published the same year. The Endocrine Society published guidelines for the hormonal care of transgender people in 2009, with a revised version in 2017.

Hormone therapy for transgender women was initially done using high-dose estrogen therapy with oral estrogens such as conjugated estrogens, ethinylestradiol, and diethylstilbestrol and with parenteral estrogens such as estradiol benzoate, estradiol valerate, estradiol cypionate, and estradiol undecylate. Progestogens, such as hydroxyprogesterone caproate, medroxyprogesterone acetate, and other progestins, were also sometimes included. The antiandrogen and progestogen cyproterone acetate was first used in transgender women by 1977. Its use was standard at the Center of Expertise on Gender Dysphoria (CEGD; Kennis- en Zorgcentrum Genderdysforie, or KZcG) in Amsterdam, the Netherlands by 1985. Spironolactone, another antiandrogen, was first used in transgender women by 1986. These agents were described as allowing the use of much lower doses of estrogen than previously required, and this was considered advantageous due to risks of high doses of estrogens such as cardiovascular complications. Antiandrogens were well-established in hormone therapy for transgender women by the early 1990s. Estrogen doses in transgender women were reduced following the introduction of antiandrogens. Ethinylestradiol, conjugated estrogens, and other non-bioidentical estrogens largely stopped being used in transgender women in favor of estradiol starting around 2000 due to their greater risks of blood clots and cardiovascular issues.

In modern times, hormone therapy in transgender women is usually done with the combination of an estrogen and an antiandrogen. In some places however, such as Japan, use of antiandrogens is uncommon, and estrogen monotherapy, for instance with high-dose injectable estradiol esters, is still frequently used.

== See also ==
- Masculinizing hormone therapy
- Menopausal hormone therapy
- DIY transgender hormone therapy
- Hormone replacement therapy
