= Dad bod =

Slang term for a body shape particular to middle-aged men

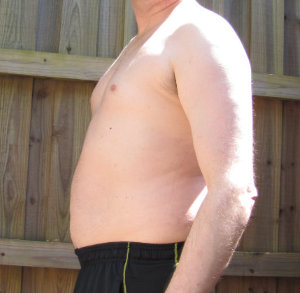
Example of a "dad bod"

"Dad bod" is a slang term referring to a body shape found mostly in middle-aged men, many of whom might be fathers and husbands. The phrase has been adopted in American culture to describe the physique of a man who was once athletic, or moderately fit, but now has a "beer belly" or "spare tire" (i.e., he has gained a noticeable amount of body fat around the waist as he aged, leading to abdominal obesity), but the arms, legs, and chest are usually in relatively good shape.

== History ==
The 1994 Mystery Science Theater 3000 episode covering Colossus and the Headhunters used the similar phrase "that's an assortment of dad bodies".

Clemson University student Mackenzie Pearson was the first to publish the term in a 2015 article titled "Why Girls Love the Dad Bod" on the crowdsourced publication platform Odyssey, but did not claim to have invented it and said that she had heard it in many different social circles. She routinely posted essays on her Odyssey account, and soon started making them humorous. After her essay went viral, it was picked up by mainstream news media including MSN, New York Daily News, The Washington Post, and Slate.

== See also ==
- Bear (gay culture)
- Somatotype and constitutional psychology
