= Gynoid fat distribution =

Female body fat around the hips, breasts and thighs

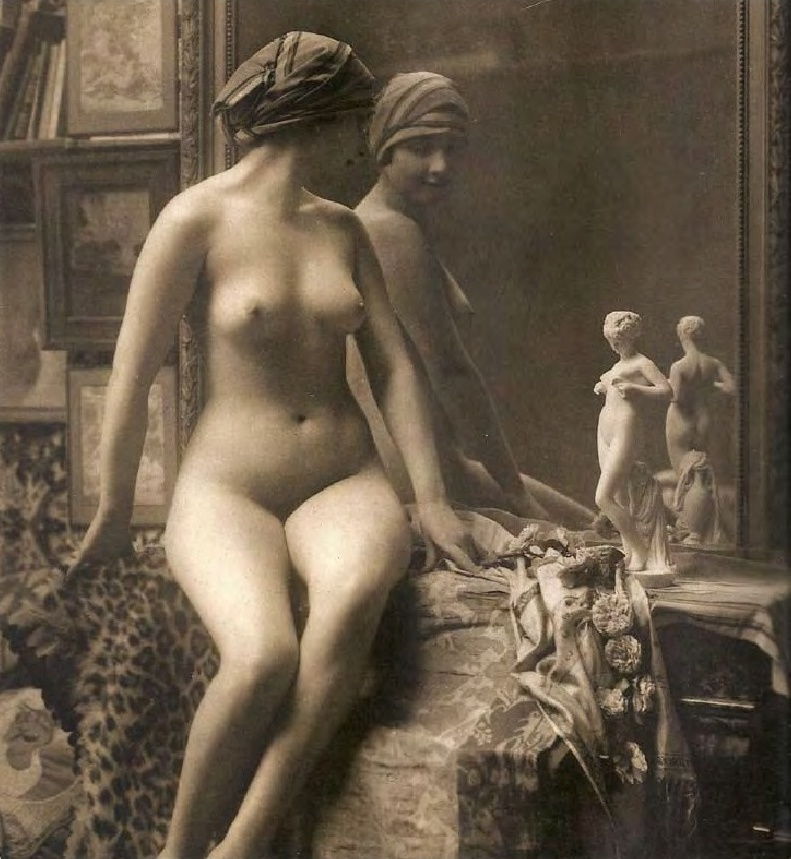
Nude photograph of an anonymous woman from the late nineteenth century

Gynoid fat is the body fat that forms around the lower body, specifically the hips, thighs and buttocks.

Gynoid fat in females is used to provide nourishment for offspring, and is often referred to as "reproductive fat". This is because it contains long-chain polyunsaturated fatty acids (PUFAs), which are important in the development of fetuses.

== Characteristics ==
=== Composition ===
Gynoid fat is mainly composed of long-chain polyunsaturated fatty acids. It is proposed that babies which are breast-fed are more likely to have increased cognitive capabilities due to these fatty acids being present in the breast milk, as they have been suggested to aid early brain development in fetuses and newborns. The most notable fatty acids found in human breast milk are docosahexaenoic acid and arachidonic acid, which have been shown to play crucial roles in the healthy formation and functions of neurons.

=== Location ===
Gynoid fat contributes toward the female body shape that girls begin to develop at puberty; it is stored in the hips, thighs and bottom. This process is modulated by estrogen, the female sex hormone, causing the female form to store higher levels of fat than the male form, which is affected primarily by testosterone.

=== Difference from android fat ===
The location of android fat differs in that it assembles around internal fat depots and the trunk (includes thorax and abdomen). Android fat has more of a survival role and is utilised by the body as an energy source when energy supplies are low, in contrast to the reproductive functions of gynoid fat.

== Reproductive function ==
Gynoid fat is regarded as a physically attractive feature, serving as an indication towards a woman's reproductive potential.

It is primarily a store of energy to be expended in the nurturing of offspring, both to provide adequate energy resources during pregnancy and for the infant during the stage in which they are breastfeeding. When there are insufficient energy resources in the environment or health issues which require energy to combat, a woman's storage of gynoid fat is likely to be reduced. Therefore, a female with high levels of gynoid fat would be signalling to males that they are in an optimal state for reproduction and nurturing of offspring. This can be seen in the fact that a female's waist–hip ratio is at its optimal minimum during times of peak fertility—late adolescence and early adulthood, before increasing later in life.

As a female's capacity for reproduction comes to an end, the fat distribution within the female body begins a transition from the gynoid type to more of an android type distribution. This is evidenced by the percentages of android fat being far higher in post-menopausal than pre-menopausal women.

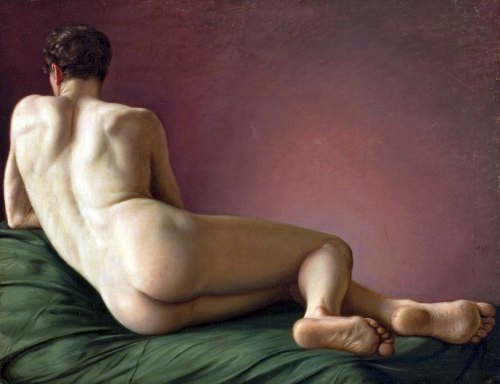
Aleksander Lessler's 1837 Reclining Male Nude illustrates gynoid fat distribution in males.

== Sex differences ==
=== Sexual dimorphism ===
The hormone estrogen inhibits fat placement in the abdominal region of the body, and stimulates fat placement in the gluteofemoral areas (the buttocks and hips). Certain hormonal imbalances can affect the fat distributions of both men and women.

Women with polyendocrine metabolic ovarian syndrome (PMOS), characterised by low estrogen, display more male type fat distributions such as a higher waist-to-hip ratio. Conversely, men who are treated with estrogen to offset testosterone related diseases such as prostate cancer may find a reduction in their waist-to-hip ratio.

The differences in gynoid fat between men and women can be seen in the typical "hourglass" figure of a woman, compared to the inverted triangle which is typical of the male figure. Women commonly have a higher body fat percentage than men, and the deposition of fat in particular areas is thought to be controlled by sex hormones and growth hormone (GH).

Sexual dimorphism in distribution of gynoid fat was thought to emerge around puberty, but as of 2005 has been found to exist earlier.

=== In transgender people ===
Transgender men and those who begin masculinizing hormone therapy see body fat redistributed within 3-6 months. Within 5 years, testosterone may cause gynoid fat to be significantly reduced.

Inversely, transgender women, or those who begin feminizing hormone therapy, experience the formation of gynoid fat along with natural breast development.

== Relevance in women's attractiveness ==
=== Waist-to-hip ratio ===
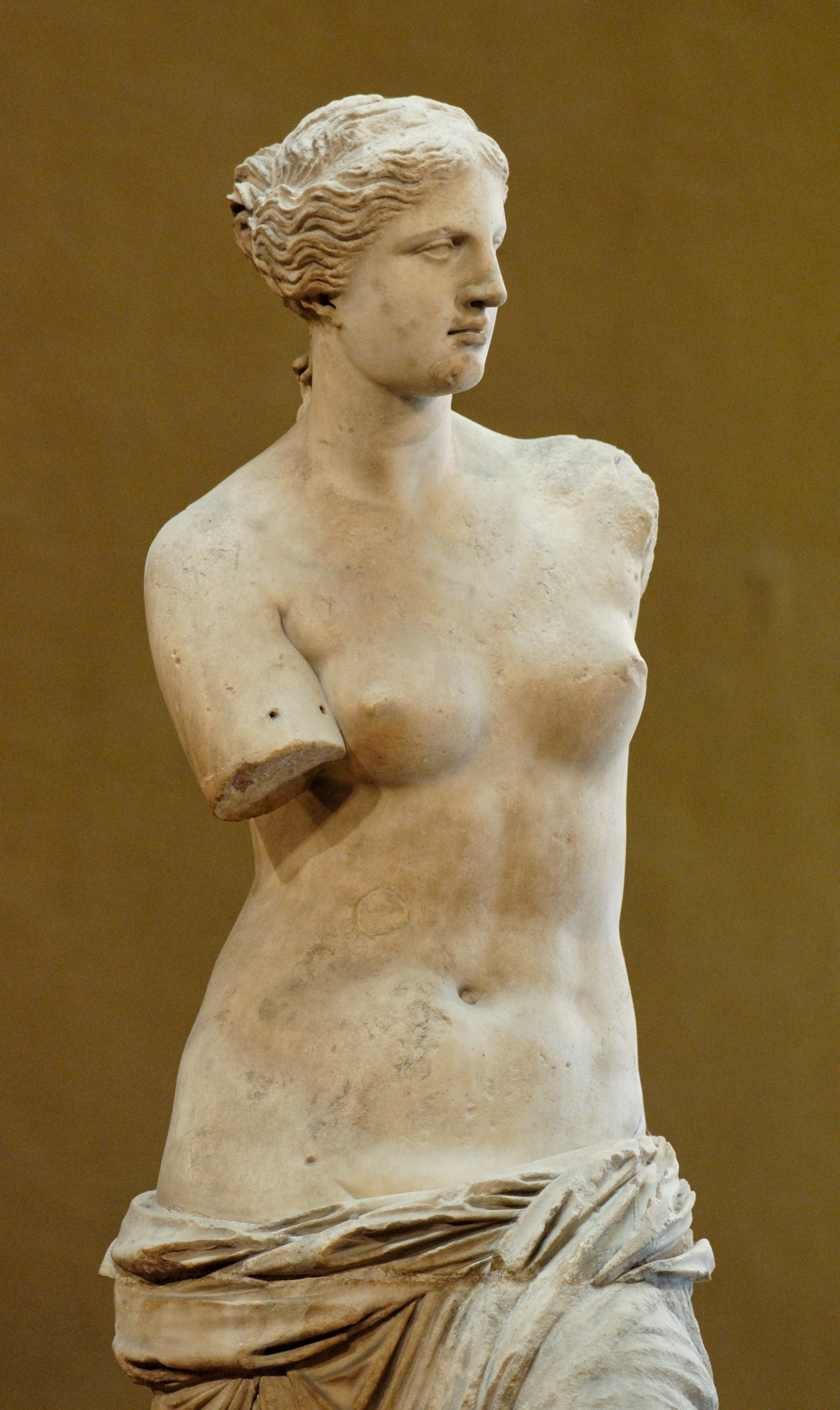
The Venus de Milo has a WHR value of 0.76.

Gynoid fat bodily distribution is measured as the waist-to-hip ratio (WHR). Studies have found correlations between WHR and intelligence quotient (IQ) levels. It was found not only that women with a lower WHR (which signals higher levels of gynoid fat) had higher levels of IQ, but also that low WHR in mothers was correlated with higher IQ levels in their children.

Android fat distribution is also related to WHR, but is the opposite to gynoid fat.

The ratio of a woman's gynoid to android fat is used to measure her WHR, whereby the lower the WHR, the higher gynoid to android fat ratio. Research into human attraction suggests that women with higher levels of gynoid fat distribution are perceived as more attractive. WHR is related to various markers of health and fertility, for example a high WHR is correlated with: a low estrogen/testosterone ratio (this means that a woman has more of a 'T-shaped' body); a high ratio is also correlated to circulatory system problems such as heart attacks and strokes; more disease (e.g. cancer); and is a general sign of increased age and hence lower fertility, therefore supporting the adaptive significance of an attractive WHR. This advantage of being more fertile has been supported by various studies, for example artificial insemination studies involving sperm donors, where the best predictor of success is a low WHR. Similarly, a high WHR has been associated with impairment in the pregnancy rate of IVF (in vitro fertilisation) embryo transfer women due to the higher levels of android fat distribution. Further studies have also found that oestrogen replacement in women lowers the WHR in pre- and post-menopausal women, and that this is because oestrogen replacement maintains gynoid fat distribution in the body.

=== Cosmetic surgery ===
Liposuction may give the illusion of different gynoid fat distribution. Other examples include fat transfer micrograft surgery, which involves the deposition of adipose tissue, previously taken from the waist, into the buttocks. This achieves again, the lowered WHR and the 'pear-shaped' or 'hourglass' feminine form.

Although liposuction changes the apparent WHR, it does not fix underlying metabolic problems.

=== Cultural differences ===
There has not been sufficient evidence to suggest there are significant differences in the perception of attractiveness across cultures.

Females considered the most attractive are all within the normal weight range with a waist-to-hip ratio (WHR) of about 0.7, regardless of body mass index (BMI), and this finding can be seen as consistent across Indonesian, Chinese, White and African-American young men and women. Psychologists have argued that evolutionary selection processes have facilitated this relationship between WHR and female attractiveness, which has resulted in a consensus that seems to transcend cultural boundaries.

== See also ==
- Android fat distribution – Human adipose tissue around the trunk and upper body
- Waist-to-height ratio – Measure of the distribution of body fat
