= Cherry Thin =

Burmese singer

Cherry Thin ချယ်ရီသင်း
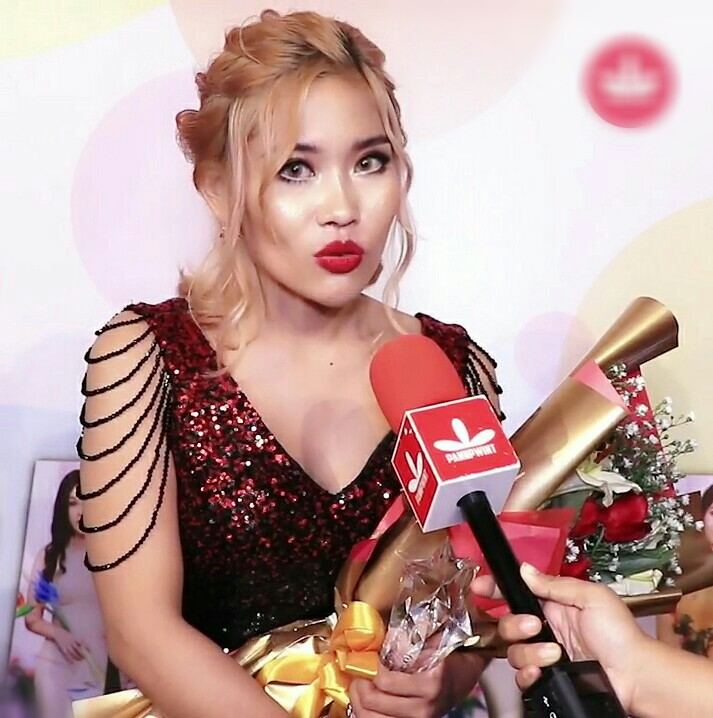
- Cherry Thin in 2019

Background information
- Born: Kar Yan Theint; 1 January 1996 (age 30); Natmauk, Myanmar
- Genres: Pop
- Occupation: Singer
- Instruments: Vocals; guitar
- Years active: 2017–present

Cherry Thin (Burmese: ချယ်ရီသင်း; born Kar Yan Theint on 1 January 1996) is a Burmese singer. She became popular after competing in a Myanmar singing contest, Eain Mat Sone Yar (Yar Thet Pan) season 5 and releasing her single song Khwint Lut Pay Pho Taung Pan Chin (ခွင့်လွှတ်ပေးဖို့တောင်းပန်ချင်), spending weeks at number 1 on Joox's Myanmar top 100 chart.

== Early life ==
Cherry Thin was born on 1 January 1996 in Natmauk, Magway Region, Myanmar.

== Career ==
In 2017, she competed in the Eapmet Sone Yar (Yar Thet Pan) during season 5. In the same year, she released her debut single song Khwint Lut Pay Pho Taung Pan Chin, increasing her popularity. Her song Khwint Lut Pay Pho Taung Pan Chin has placed as number 1 on Joox's top 100 chart.

In 2019, her song Khwint Lut Pay Pho Taung Pan Chin won Female Singer Award of Most Requested Song from Shwe FM Facebook Page for 2019 in Shwe FM 10th Anniversary. In 2020, her single song Ma Loh Pal Khaw was released and became popular among audiences. It also reached number 1 on Joox's top 100 chart. The song Ma Loh Pal Khaw also placed in the Top 10 Once in the Myanmar [Burma] Top 40 Chart.

On 25 September 2020, she sang the song Mone Mone May May at the 100th Anniversary of Burmese Film music concert.

On January 22, 2021, she sang the song "A Chit Sone Moht Pyaw Pya Chin Par Tal" at the music concert held in celebration of the 75th Anniversary of MRTV.

== Discography ==
=== Single ===
- Khwint Lut Pay Pho Taung Pan Chin (ခွင့်လွှတ်ပေးဖို့တောင်းပန်ချင်) (2017)
- Ma Loh Pal Khaw (မလို့ပဲခေါ်) (2020)
- Thati Htar (သတိထား) (2020)
- Chit Yat Nae Chit Thu (ချစ်ရက်နဲ့ချစ်သူ) (2019)
- A Sin Pway Pho Khat Thal (အဆင်ပြေဖို့ခက်တယ်) with Min Khant (2020)
- Poe Soe Pat Sat A Thae Kwae Nay The (ပိုးစိုးပက်စက်အသည်းကွဲနေသည်) (2019)
- Swae Nay Pyi (စွဲနေပြီ) (2020)
- Yee Sar Lay Pae Lo Tal (ရည်စားလေးပဲလိုတယ်) (2020)
- A Thal Kwae Yan Ma Shi (အသည်းကွဲရန်မရှိ) (2019)
- A Chain Tway Ku Sar Thwar Lain Mal (အချိန်တွေကုစားသွားလိမ့်မယ်) (2019)
- Kyway Pyi Lay Icezz (ကြွေပြီလေ အိုက်စ်) with Po Po and L Zartar Kyi Phyu (2020)
- Ma Yone Ye Bu (မယုံရဲဘူး) with Thar Thar (2019)
- A Wedding Day with Zay Naing and Htet Hlyan Hmue (2019)

== Award ==
- Female Singer Award of Most Requested Song from Shwe FM Facebook Page for 2019 (Shwe FM 10th Anniversary)
