= Paper Thin =

Paper Thin may refer to:

- "Paper Thin" (Illenium, Tom DeLonge and Angels & Airwaves song), 2020
- "Paper Thin" (MC Lyte song), 1988
- "Paper Thin", a song by Nick Oliveri from the 2004 album Demolition Day
- "Paper Thin", a song by Astrid S, 2015
- “Paper Thin”, a play by T.K. Lee, 2018
