= Thin Thin =

Thin Thin is a Burmese name that may refer to the following notable people:

- Thin Thin Aye (1970–2018), Burmese democracy activist known as Mie Mie
- Thin Thin Khaing (born 1978), Burmese archer
- Thin Thin Soe (born 1989), Burmese football goalkeeper
