= Android fat distribution =

Human adipose tissue around the trunk and upper body

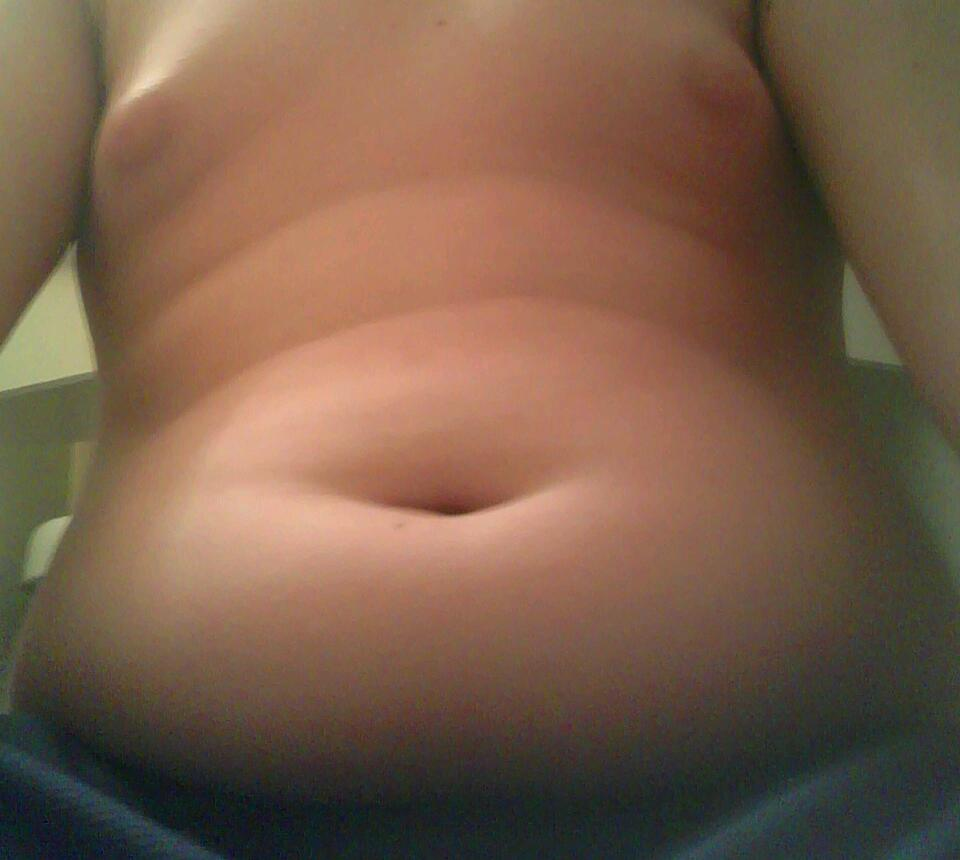
Example of android fat accumulation in a teenage male

Android fat distribution describes the distribution of human adipose tissue mainly around the trunk and upper body, in areas such as the abdomen, chest, shoulder and nape of the neck. This pattern may lead to a "triangle"-shaped body or central obesity, and is more common in males than in females. Thus, the android fat distribution of men is about 48.6%, which is 10.3% higher than that of premenopausal women. In other cases, an ovoid shape forms, which does not differentiate between men and women. Generally, during early adulthood, females tend to have a more peripheral fat distribution, so that their fat is evenly distributed over their body. However, it has been found that as females age, bear children and approach menopause, this distribution shifts towards the android pattern of fat distribution, resulting in a 42.1% increase in android body fat distribution in postmenopausal women. This could potentially provide evolutionary advantages, such as lowering a woman's center of gravity, making her more stable when carrying offspring.

Android fat distribution is contrasted with gynoid fat distribution, whereby fat around the hips, thighs, and bottom results in a "pear"-shaped body.

Jean Vague, a physician from Marseilles, France, was one of the first individuals to bring to attention the increased risk of developing certain diseases (e.g., diabetes and gout) in individuals with an android distribution compared to a gynoid distribution. There are other health consequences beyond these, including psychological consequences.

== Biology ==
Android fat is readily mobilized by deficits in energy balance. It is stored in different places from gynoid fat: android fat is stored in the upper body and can present a so-called "triangle-shaped" body, while gynoid fat is stored in the lower body and can result in a "pear-shaped" body.

Android fat cells are mostly visceral: they are large, are deposited deep under the skin and are highly metabolically active. The hormones they secrete have direct access to the liver. The presence of fat in the trunk and upper body in males is facilitated by testosterone. Testosterone circulation causes fat cells to be deposited around the abdominal and gluteofemoral region, whereas in women oestrogen circulation leads to fat deposits around areas such as the thighs, the hips and the buttocks. Therefore, measuring a person's oestrogen to testosterone ratio can reveal their predicted gynoid to android fat distribution. Android fat develops as a back-up source of energy when the male body is experiencing an imbalance, whereas gynoid fat develops after puberty, in order to better prepare the body for supporting a potential infant. 50% of the variance in abdominal fat mass observed in humans is due to genetic factors.

The cellular characteristics of adipose tissue in android and [gynoid] obese women are different. Android type have larger fat (hypertrophy) cells whereas gynoid type have increased number of fat cells (hyperplasia). This allows for hypertrophic obesity and hyperplastic obesity. Two different receptors, alpha and beta fat cell receptors, vary in their ability to facilitate or inhibit fat mobilization. Alpha receptors are predominately in the lower body thus more abundant in gynoid patterns, and beta receptors are predominantly in the upper body, and so are more abundant in android patterns.

=== Causes ===
Hormonal disorders or fluctuations can lead to the formation of a lot of visceral fat and a protruding abdomen. Medications such as protease inhibitors that are used to treat HIV and AIDS also form visceral fat. Android fat can be controlled with proper diet and exercise. A poor diet with lack of exercise is likely to increase android fat level.

== Health consequences ==
Differences in body fat distribution are found to be associated with high blood pressure, high triglyceride, lower high-density lipoprotein (HDL) cholesterol levels and high fasting and post-oral glucose insulin levels

The android, or male pattern, fat distribution has been associated with a higher incidence of coronary artery disease, in addition to an increase in resistance to insulin in both obese children and adolescents. Studies have also related central abdominal obesity (indicated via increased waist–hip ratio) with increases in peripheral fasting insulin levels.

Android fat is also associated with a change in pressor response in circulation. Specifically, in response to stress in a subject with central obesity the cardiac output dependent pressor response is shifted toward a generalised rise in peripheral resistance with an associated decrease in cardiac output.

There are differences in android and gynoid fat distribution among individuals, which relates to various health issues among individuals. Android body fat distribution is related to high cardiovascular disease and mortality rate. People with android obesity have higher hematocrit and red blood cell count and higher blood viscosity than people with gynoid obesity. Blood pressure is also higher in those with android obesity which leads to cardiovascular disease.

Women who are infertile and have polyendocrine metabolic ovarian syndrome (PMOS) show high amounts of android fat tissue. In contrast, patients with anorexia nervosa have increased gynoid fat percentage Women normally have small amounts of androgen, however when the amount is too high they develop male psychological characteristics and male physical characteristics of muscle mass, structure and function and an android adipose tissue distribution. Women who have high amounts of androgen and thus an increase tendency for android fat distribution are in the lowest quintiles of levels of sex-hormone-binding globulin and more are at high risks of ill health associated with android fat

High levels of android fat have been associated with obesity and diseases caused by insulin insensitivity, such as diabetes. Insulin responsiveness is dependent on adipose cell size. The larger the adipose cell size the less sensitive the insulin. Diabetes is more likely to occur in obese women with android fat distribution and hypertrophic fat cells. It is not just general obesity that is a consequence of android fat distribution but also other health consequences. There are connections between high android fat distributions and the severity of diseases such as acute pancreatitis - where the higher the levels of android fat are, the more severe the pancreatitis can be. An increase in android fat distribution is positively correlated with foot pain and disability associated with foot pain. Foot pain is reported to be the second most common musculoskeletal symptom in children who are obese. Even adults who are overweight and obese report foot pain to be a common problem.

=== Psychological consequences ===
Body fat can impact on an individual mentally. High levels of android fat have been linked to poor mental wellbeing, including anxiety, depression and body confidence issues. On the reverse, psychological aspects can impact on body fat distribution too. Women classed as being more extroverted tend to have less android body fat.

== Waist–hip ratio ==
Central obesity is measured as increase by waist circumference or waist–hip ratio (WHR). Increase in waist circumference > 102 cm (40 in.) in males and > 88 cm (35 in.) in females. However increase in abdominal circumference may be due to increasing in subcutaneous or visceral fat, and it is the visceral fat which increases the risk of coronary diseases. The visceral fat can be estimated with the help of MRI and CT scan.

Waist to hip ratio is determined by an individual's proportions of android fat and gynoid fat. A small waist to hip ratio indicates less android fat, high waist to hip ratio's indicate high levels of android fat.

As WHR is associated with a woman's pregnancy rate, it has been found that a high waist-to-hip ratio can impair pregnancy, thus a health consequence of high android fat levels is its interference with the success of pregnancy and in-vitro fertilisation. Body fat distribution is also related to the sex ratio of offspring. Women with large waists (a high WHR) tend to have an android fat distribution caused by a specific hormone profile, that is, having higher levels of androgens. This leads to such women having more sons.

=== Liposuction ===
Liposuction is a medical procedure used to remove fat from the body, common areas being around the abdomen, thighs and buttocks. Liposuction does not improve an individual's health or insulin sensitivity and is therefore considered a cosmetic surgery. Liposuction improves quality of life in everyday activities and issues regarding ones psychological state or social life after liposuction are less serious. It has been found that abdominal exercise alone cannot reduce android fat around the trunk and abdomen so liposuction is often a short-term solution.

Another method of reducing android fat is Laparoscopic Adjustable Gastric Banding which has been found to significantly reduce overall android fat percentages in obese individuals.

== Individual differences ==
=== Cultural differences ===
Cultural differences in the distribution of android fat have been observed in several studies. Compared to Europeans, South Asian individuals living in the UK have greater abdominal fat. Asian Indians living in the USA have high levels of body fat in contrast to their muscle mass and BMI Newborn babies in India also show similar differences in their body fat distribution. There is a difference in waist-to-hip ratio (WHRs) between Indian people and Africans living in South Africa such that Indians have greater WHRs compared to African people.

A difference in body fat distribution was observed between men and women living in Denmark (this includes both android fat distribution and gynoid fat distribution), of those aged between 35 and 65 years, men showed greater body fat mass than women. Men showed a total body fat mass increase of 6.9 kg and women showed a total body fat mass increase of 4.5 kg between the ages of 35 and 65. These observed differences could be due to a difference in muscularity. Australian Aborigines who live a hunter gatherer lifestyle, have been noted to have high levels of obesity (with an android fat distribution) when they switch to a Westernized lifestyle. This is because in comparison to their previous lifestyle where they would engage in strenuous physical activity daily and have meals that are low in fat and high in fiber, the Westernized lifestyle has less physical activity and the diet includes high levels of carbohydrates and fats.

=== Age related changes ===
Android fat distributions change across life course. The main changes in women are associated with menopause. Premenopausal women tend to show a more gynoid fat distribution than post-menopausal women - this is associated with a drop in oestrogen levels. An android fat distribution becomes more common post-menopause, where oestrogen is at its lowest levels. Older men show android fat distributions more often than younger men which may be due to lifestyle changes, or hormonal changes related to age. Older adults have a greater waist-to-hip ratio than young adults which indicates high levels of android fat in older adults. Computed tomography studies show that older adults have a two-fold increase in visceral fat compared to young adults. These changes in android fat distribution in older adults occurs in the absence of any clinical diseases.

== See also ==
- Gynoid fat distribution – Female body fat around the hips, breasts and thighs
- Waist-to-height ratio – Measure of the distribution of body fat
