= CH5NO =

The molecular formula CH_{5}NO (molar mass: 47.057 g/mol) may refer to:

- Aminomethanol, or methanolamine
- Methoxyamine, or O-methylhydroxylamine
- N-Methylhydroxylamine, or methylhydroxylamine
