= N,O-Dimethylhydroxylamine =

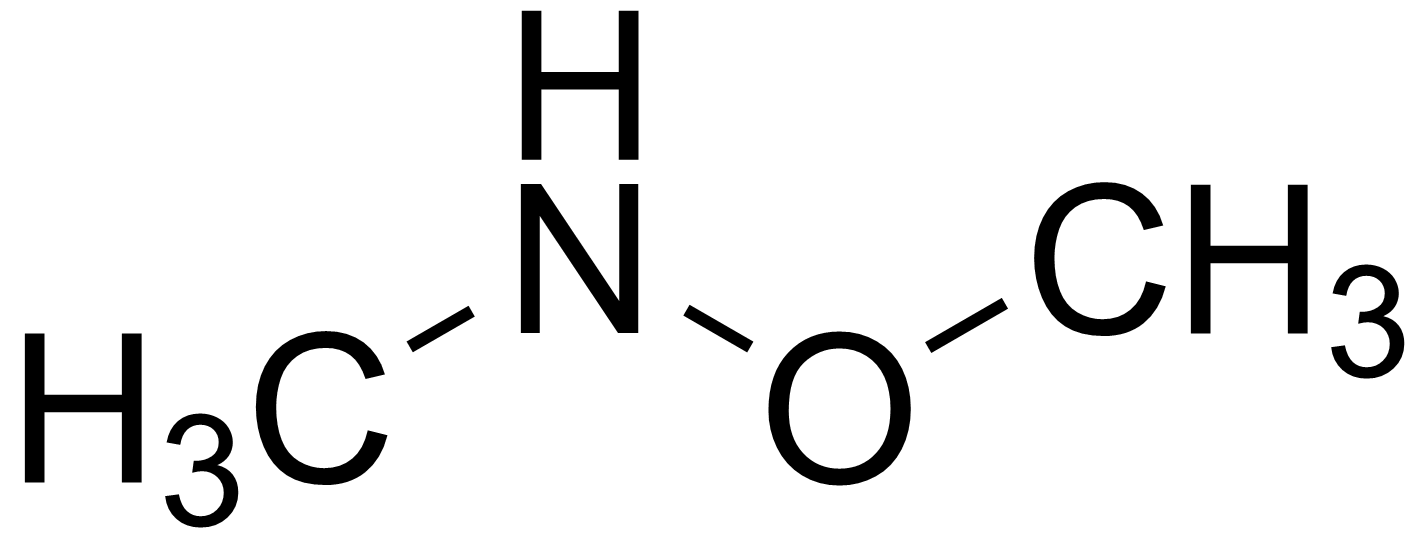

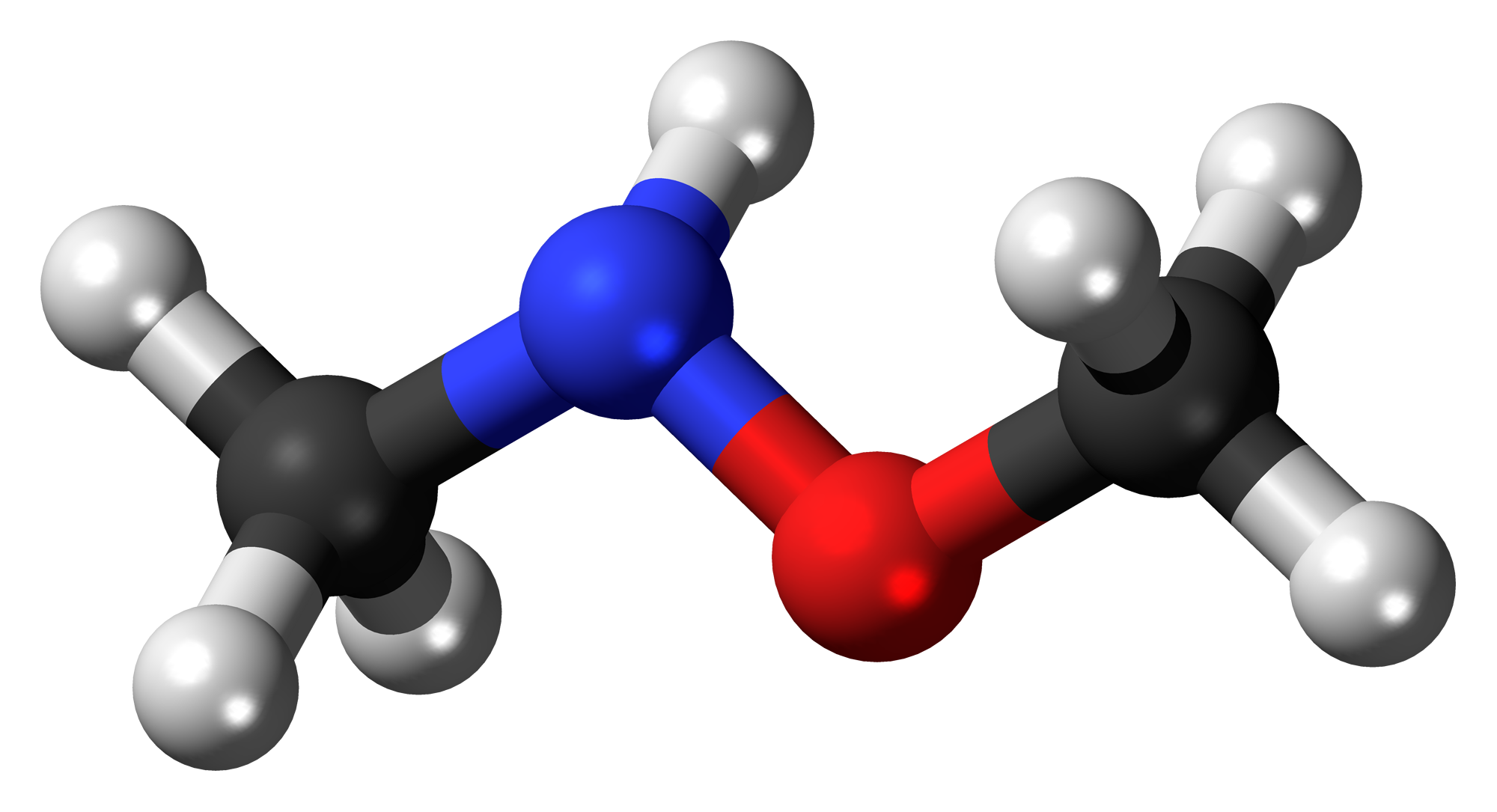

Names
- Preferred IUPAC name N-Methoxymethanamine
- Other names Methoxymethylamine; Methylmethoxyamine; HNMeOMe

Identifiers
CAS Number	1117-97-1; 6638-79-5 (HCl)
3D model (JSmol)	Interactive image
ChemSpider	13596
ECHA InfoCard	100.012.960
PubChem CID	14232
UNII	783670HYEO
CompTox Dashboard (EPA)	DTXSID5051577
- InChI: InChI=1S/C2H7NO/c1-3-4-2/h3H,1-2H3 Key: KRKPYFLIYNGWTE-UHFFFAOYSA-N; InChI=1/C2H7NO/c1-3-4-2/h3H,1-2H3 Key: KRKPYFLIYNGWTE-UHFFFAOYAP
- SMILES: CNOC

Properties
Chemical formula	C_{2}H_{7}NO
Molar mass	61.084 g·mol^{−1}
Appearance	Colorless liquid
Melting point	−97 °C (−143 °F; 176 K) Hydrochloride salt: 112 to 115 °C (234 to 239 °F; 385 to 388 K)
Boiling point	43.2 °C (109.8 °F; 316.3 K)

Hazards
- Occupational safety and health (OHS/OSH)
Main hazards	Serious eye irritation
- GHS labelling
Pictograms	(GHS07: Exclamation mark)
Signal word	Warning
Hazard statements	H315, H319, H335
Precautionary statements	P261, P264, P264+P265, P271, P280, P302+P352, P304+P340, P305+P351+P338, P319, P321, P332+P317, P337+P317, P362+P364, P403+P233, P405, P501
- Except where otherwise noted, data are given for materials in their standard state (at 25 °C [77 °F], 100 kPa). verify (what is ?) Infobox references

N,O-Dimethylhydroxylamine is an organic compound with the chemical formula CH_{3}NHOCH_{3}. Its structure is H_{3}C−NH−O−CH_{3}. It is a colorless liquid. It is a methylated hydroxylamine used to form so called 'Weinreb amides' for use in the Weinreb ketone synthesis. It is commercially available as its hydrochloride salt (methoxy(methyl)ammonium chloride [CH_{3}O(CH_{3})NH_{2}]^{+}Cl^{−}).

== Synthesis ==
It may be prepared by reacting ethyl chloroformate (or similar) with hydroxylamine followed by treatment with a methylating agent such as dimethyl sulfate. The N,O-dimethylhydroxylamine is then liberated by acid hydrolysis followed by neutralization.

== Applications ==
Final products containing N,O-Dimethylhydroxylamine include the following: linuron, monolinuron, metobromuron, metobenzuron, chlorbromuron & sarecycline.

== See also ==
- Methoxyamine
- N-methylhydroxylamine
