= ODHA =

ODHA may refer to:

- Hockey Eastern Ontario (HEO), formerly the Ottawa District Hockey Association (ODHA)
- Oficina de Derechos Humanos del Arzobispado, ODHA (Office of Human Rights of the Archbishopric). See Juan José Gerardi Conedera.
- O-Octadecylhydroxylamine, a chemical compound
