= Alkoxyamines =

Class of organic compounds

Alkoxyamines are a class of organic compounds with the general structure R^{1}R^{2}N−OR^{3}, where R^{3} is an alkyl group and R^{1} and R^{2} are an organyl or hydrogen. They are O-substituted hydroxylamines.

== Examples ==
- Methoxyamine
- Ethoxyamine
- O-Octadecylhydroxylamine
