= Weinreb ketone synthesis =

Chemical reaction

Named after	Steven M. Weinreb
Reaction type	Coupling reaction

Identifiers
Organic Chemistry Portal	weinreb-ketone-synthesis

The Weinreb ketone synthesis or Weinreb–Nahm ketone synthesis is a chemical reaction used in organic chemistry to make carbon–carbon bonds. It was discovered in 1981 by Steven M. Weinreb and Steven Nahm as a method to synthesize ketones. The original reaction involved two subsequent substitutions: the conversion of an acid chloride with N,O-dimethylhydroxylamine, to form a Weinreb–Nahm amide, and subsequent treatment of this species with an organometallic reagent such as a Grignard reagent or organolithium reagent. Nahm and Weinreb also reported the synthesis of aldehydes by reduction of the amide with an excess of lithium aluminum hydride (see amide reduction).

The Weinreb–Nahm ketone synthesis

The major advantage of this method over addition of organometallic reagents to more typical acyl compounds is that it avoids the common problem of over-addition. For these latter reactions, two equivalents of the incoming group add to form an alcohol rather than a ketone or aldehyde. This occurs even if the equivalents of nucleophile are closely controlled.

Overaddition of nucleophiles

The Weinreb–Nahm amide has since been adopted into regular use by organic chemists as a dependable method for the synthesis of ketones. These functional groups are present in a large number of natural products and can be reliably reacted to form new carbon–carbon bonds or converted into other functional groups. This method has been used in a number of syntheses, including macrosphelides A and B, amphidinolide J, and spirofungins A and B.

== Mechanism ==
Weinreb and Nahm originally proposed the following reaction mechanism to explain the selectivity shown in reactions of the Weinreb–Nahm amide. Their suggestion was that the tetrahedral intermediate (A below) formed as a result of nucleophilic addition by the organometallic reagent is stabilized by chelation from the methoxy group as shown. This intermediate is stable only at low temperatures, requiring a low-temperature quench.

Chelation mechanism

This chelation is in contrast to the mechanism for formation of the over-addition product wherein collapse of the tetrahedral intermediate allows a second addition. The mechanistic conjecture on the part of Weinreb was immediately accepted by the academic community, but it was not until 2006 that it was confirmed by spectroscopic and kinetic analyses.

== Preparation ==
In addition to the original procedure shown above (which may have compatibility issues for sensitive substrates), Weinreb amides can be synthesized from a variety of acyl compounds. The vast majority of these procedures utilize the commercially available salt N,O-dimethylhydroxylamine hydrochloride [MeO(Me)NH•HCl], which is typically easier to handle than the free amine.

Treatment of an ester or lactone with AlMe_{3} or AlMe_{2}Cl affords the corresponding Weinreb amide in good yields. Alternatively, non-nucleophilic Grignard reagents such as isopropyl magnesium chloride can be used to activate the amine before addition of the ester.

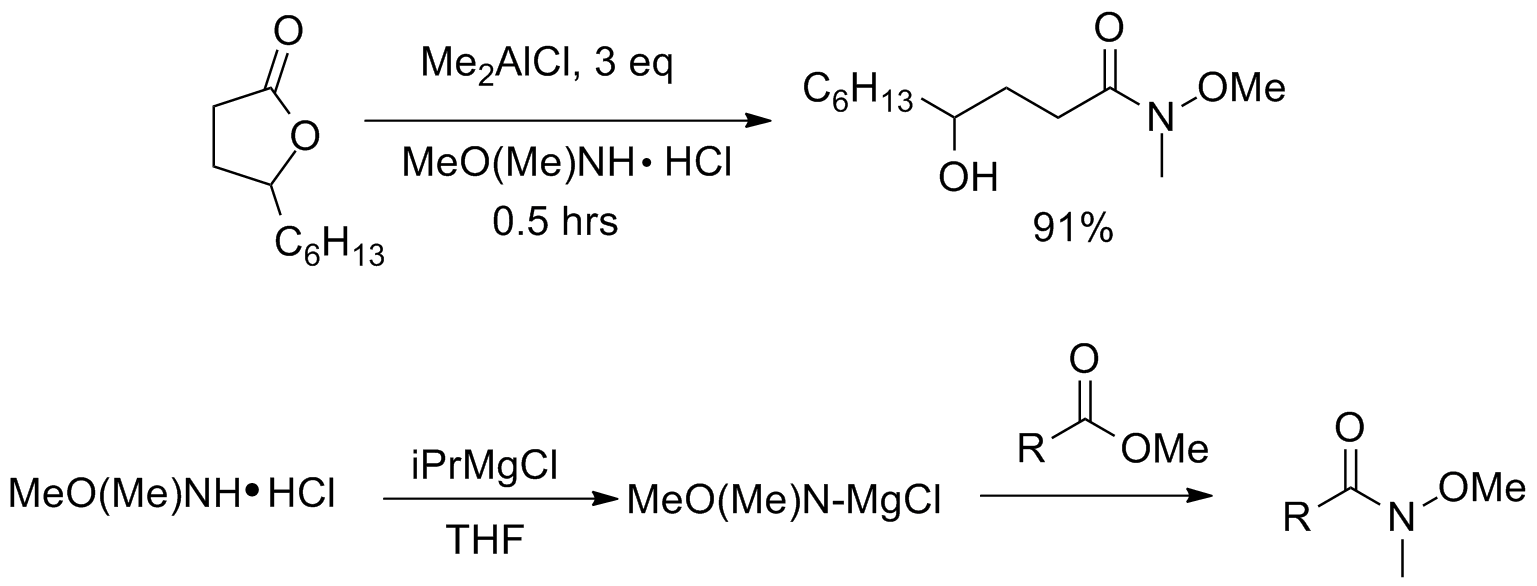
Example of syntheses from esters and lactones

A variety of peptide coupling reagents can also be used to prepare Weinreb–Nahm amides from carboxylic acids. Various carbodiimide-, hydroxybenzotriazole-, and triphenylphosphine-based couplings have been reported specifically for this purpose.

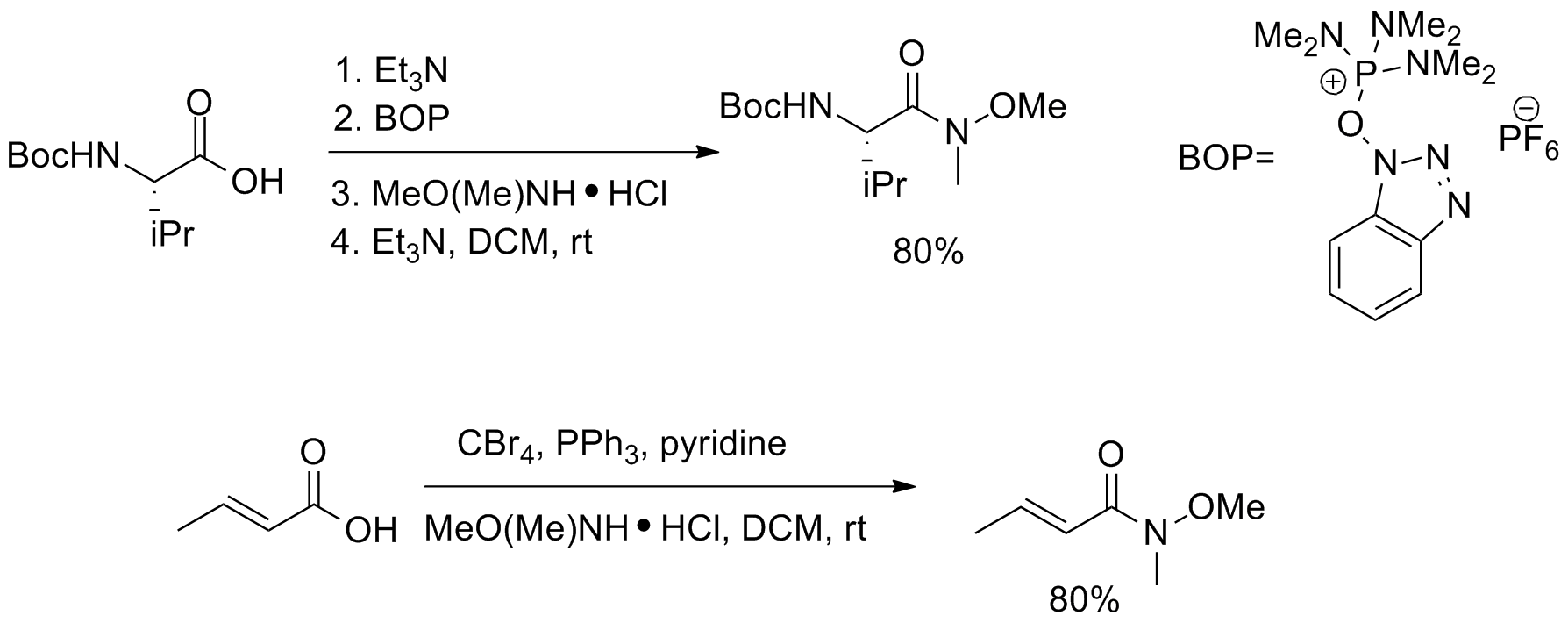
Example of Syntheses from Carboxyllic Acids

Finally, an aminocarbonylation reaction reported by Stephen Buchwald allows conversion of aryl halides directly into aryl Weinreb–Nahm amides.

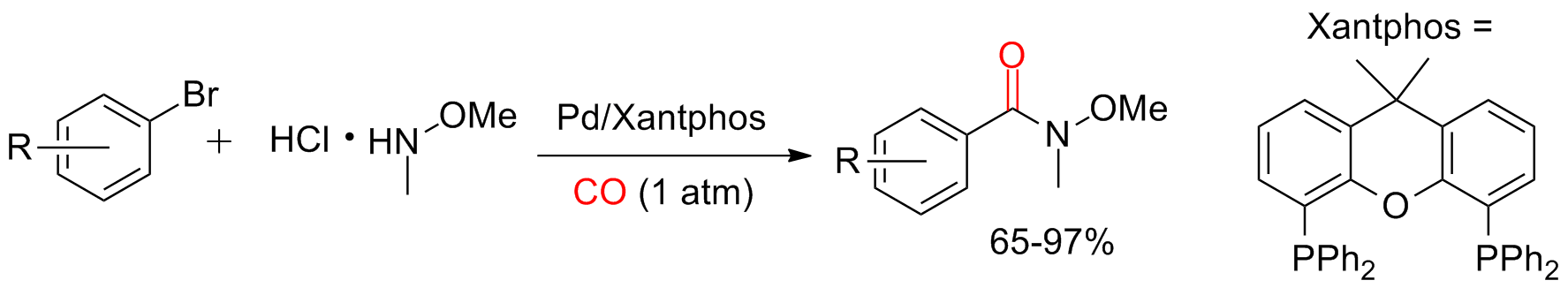
Aminocarbonylation to form Weinreb–Nahm amides

== Scope ==
The standard conditions for the Weinreb–Nahm ketone synthesis are known to tolerate a wide variety of functional groups elsewhere in the molecule, including alpha-halogen substitution, N-protected amino acids, α-β unsaturation, silyl ethers, various lactams and lactones, sulfonates, sulfinates, and phosphonate esters. A wide variety of nucleophiles can be used in conjunction with the amide. Lithiates and Grignard reagents are most commonly employed; examples involving aliphatic, vinyl, aryl, and alkynyl carbon nucleophiles have been reported. However, with highly basic or sterically hindered nucleophiles, elimination of the methoxide moiety to release formaldehyde can occur as a significant side reaction.

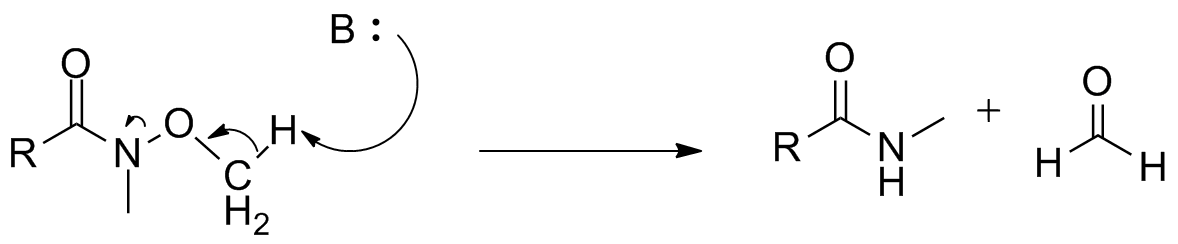
Side reaction

Nonetheless, the Weinreb–Nahm amide figures prominently into many syntheses, serving as an important coupling partner for various fragments. Shown below are key steps involving Weinreb amides in the synthesis of several natural products, including members of the immunosuppressant family of macrosphelides, and the antibiotic family of spirofungins.

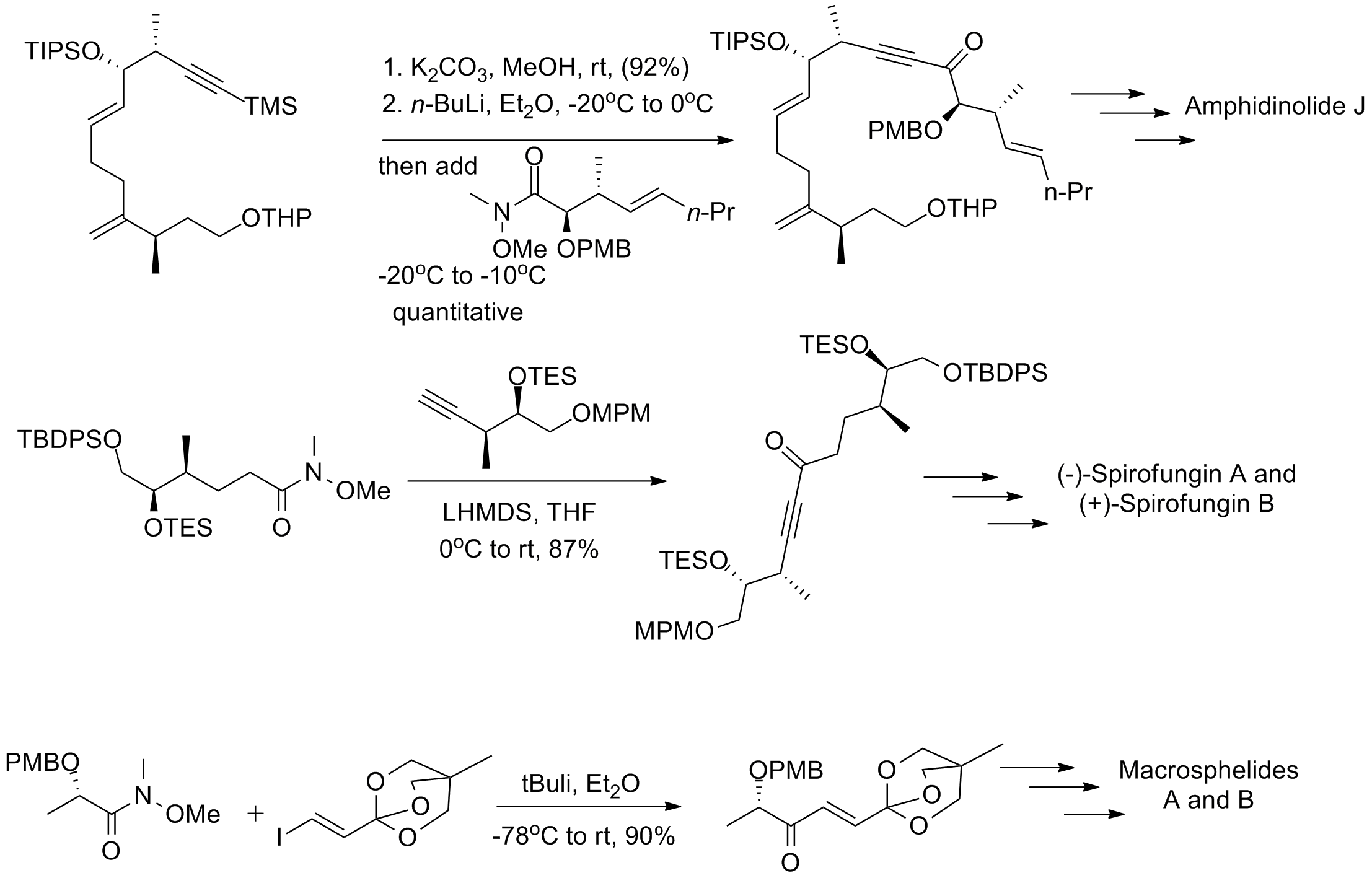
Syntheses using Weinreb–Nahm amide

== Variations ==
Reaction of Weinreb–Nahm amides with Wittig reagents has been performed to avoid the sometimes harsh conditions required for addition of hydride reagents or organometallic compounds. This yields an N-methyl-N-methoxy-enamine that converts to the corresponding ketone or aldehyde upon hydrolytic workup.

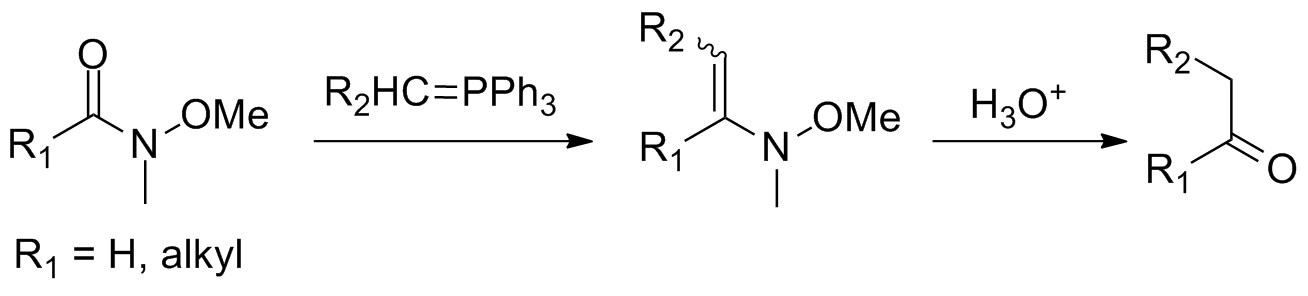
Reaction of Weinreb–Nahm amides with Wittig reagents

Additionally, a one-pot magnesium–halogen exchange with subsequent arylation has been developed, showcasing the stability of the Weinreb–Nahm amide and providing an operationally simple method for the synthesis of aryl ketones.

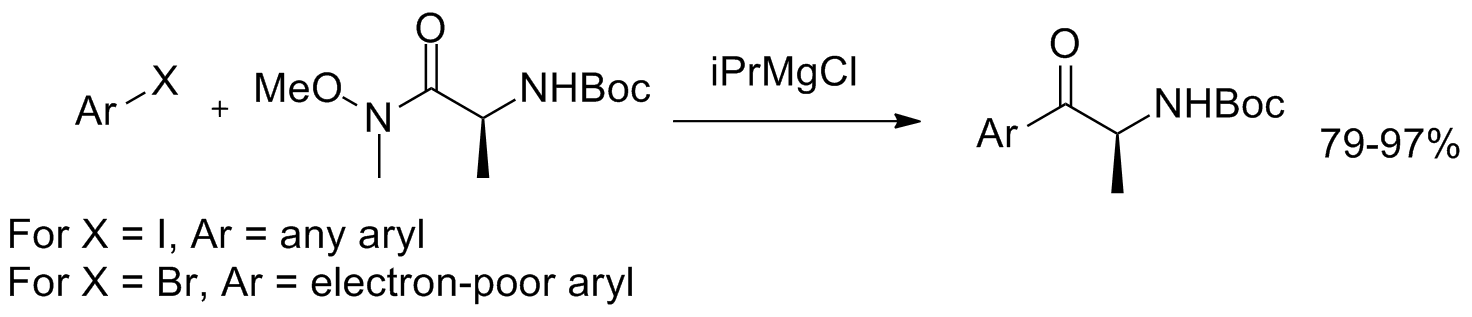
One-pot arylation reaction

More unusual reagents with multiple Weinreb–Nahm amide functional groups have been synthesized, serving as CO_{2} and α-diketone synthons.

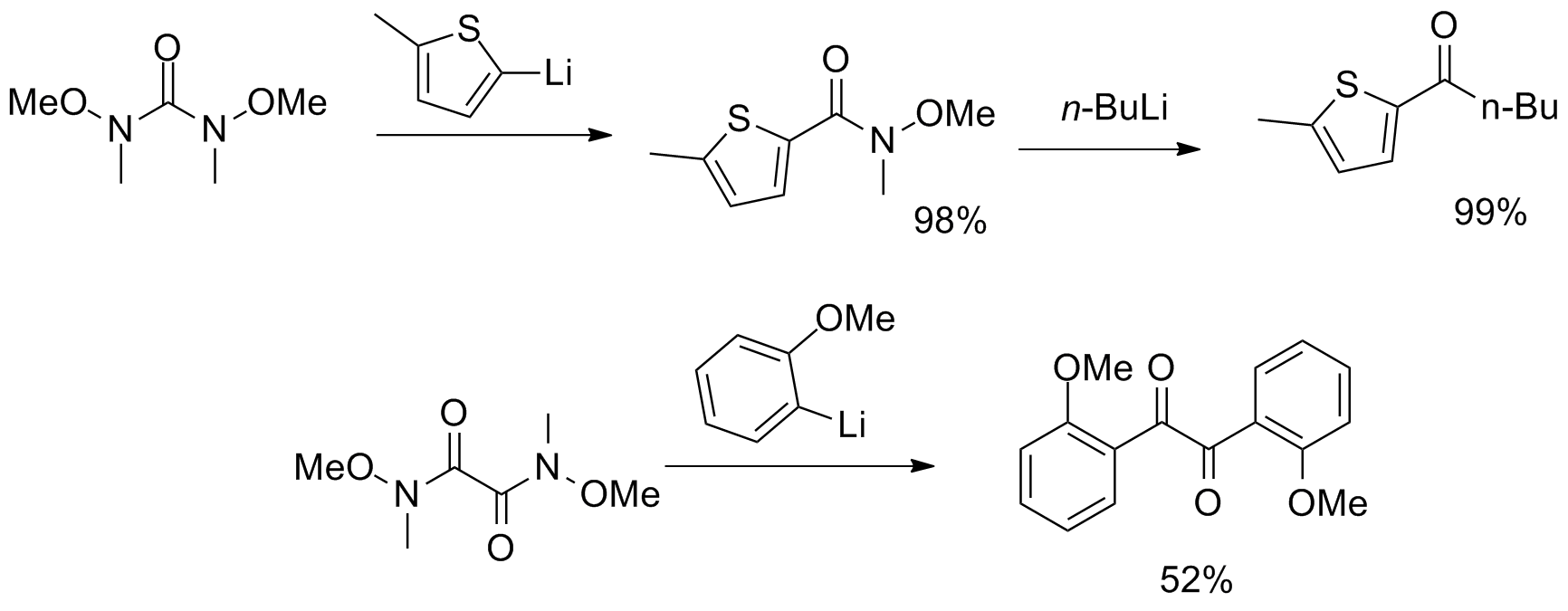
Synthons based on Weinreb–Nahm-amides

Finally, Stephen G. Davies of Oxford has designed a chiral auxiliary that combines the functionality of the Weinreb amide with that of the Myers' pseudoephedrine auxiliary, allowing diastereoselective enolate alkylation followed by facile cleavage to the corresponding enantioenriched aldehyde or ketone.

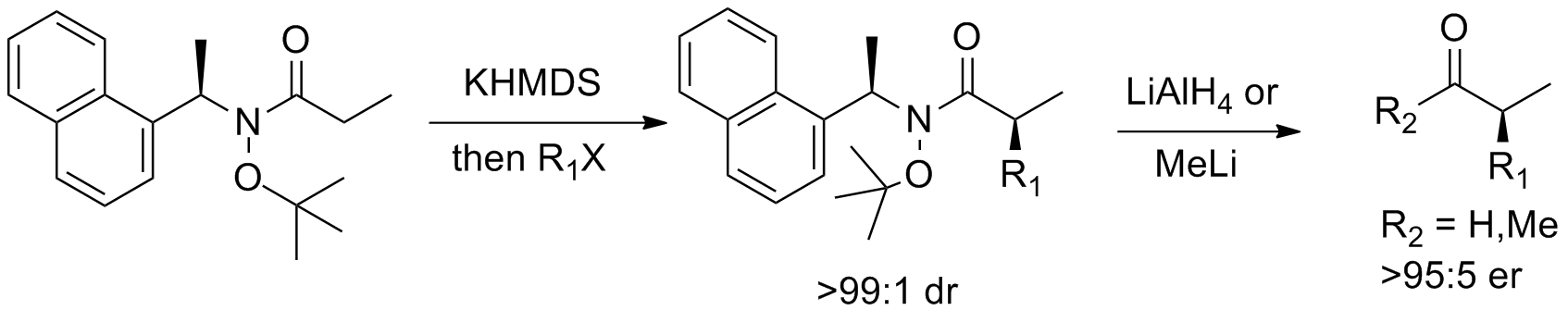
Davies' Auxiliary with Weinreb–Nahm-like functionality

== See also ==
- N,O-Dimethylhydroxylamine
- Dakin-West reaction § General ketone synthesis
- Ketone § Synthesis
