= Relugolix/estradiol/norethisterone acetate =

Combination medication

Combination of
- Relugolix: GnRH antagonist
- Estradiol (medication): Estrogen
- Norethisterone acetate: Progestogen

Clinical data
- Trade names: Myfembree, Ryeqo
- Other names: RGX/E2/NETA; MVT-601
- AHFS/Drugs.com: Multum Consumer Information
- MedlinePlus: a622069
- License data: US DailyMed: Relugolix and estradiol
- Pregnancy category: AU: D
- Routes of administration: By mouth
- ATC code: H01CC54 (WHO)

Legal status
- Legal status: AU: S4 (Prescription only); CA: ℞-only; UK: POM (Prescription only); US: ℞-only; EU: Rx-only

Identifiers
- KEGG: D12226

Relugolix/estradiol/norethisterone acetate, sold under the brand names Myfembree and Ryeqo, is a fixed-dose combination hormonal medication which is used for the treatment of heavy menstrual bleeding associated with uterine leiomyomas (fibroids) and for moderate to severe pain associated with endometriosis. It contains relugolix, an orally active gonadotropin-releasing hormone antagonist (GnRH antagonist), estradiol, an estrogen, and norethisterone acetate, a progestin. The medication is taken by mouth.

The most common side effects of the medication include hot flushes, excessive sweating or night sweats, uterine bleeding, hair loss or thinning, and decreased interest in sex.

The medication was approved for medical use in the United States in May 2021, and in the European Union in July 2021.

== Medical uses ==
The medication is used in the treatment of heavy menstrual bleeding associated with uterine fibroids and for moderate to severe pain associated with endometriosis, both in premenopausal women.

=== Available forms ===
The medication is formulated as an oral tablet containing a fixed-dose combination of 40 mg relugolix, 1 mg estradiol, and 0.5 mg norethisterone acetate.

== Pharmacology ==
=== Pharmacodynamics ===
Relugolix acts as an GnRH antagonist, or an antagonist of the gonadotropin-releasing hormone receptor. Estradiol is an estrogen, or an agonist of the estrogen receptors, whereas norethisterone acetate is a progestin (synthetic progestogen), or an agonist of the progesterone receptors. Relugolix suppresses ovarian sex hormone production, whereas estradiol and norethisterone acetate provide hormonal add-back to reduce hypogonadal and menopausal-like symptoms.

== History ==
The medication was approved for medical use in the United States in May 2021.

In May 2021, the Committee for Medicinal Products for Human Use (CHMP) of the European Medicines Agency (EMA) adopted a positive opinion, recommending the granting of a marketing authorization for the medicinal product Ryeqo, intended for the treatment of symptoms of uterine fibroids. The applicant for this medicinal product is Gedeon Richter Plc. The combination was approved for medical use in the European Union in July 2021.

In August 2022, the medication was approved for the treatment of moderate to severe pain associated with endometriosis in the United States.

== Research ==
The combination is also under development as a birth control pill for prevention of pregnancy in premenopausal women.
