= Sufugolix =

Chemical compound

Clinical data
- Other names: TAK-013
- Routes of administration: By mouth
- Drug class: GnRH modulator; GnRH antagonist; Antigonadotropin
- ATC code: None

Identifiers
- IUPAC name: 1-[4-[5-[[benzyl(methyl)amino]methyl]-1-[(2,6-difluorophenyl)methyl]-2,4-dioxo-3-phenylthieno[2,3-d]pyrimidin-6-yl]phenyl]-3-methoxyurea
- CAS Number: 308831-61-0
- PubChem CID: 3038517
- ChemSpider: 2302081
- UNII: 56S17Z6X9M
- CompTox Dashboard (EPA): DTXSID40184893

Chemical and physical data
- Formula: C_{36}H_{31}F_{2}N_{5}O_{4}S
- Molar mass: 667.73 g·mol^{−1}
- 3D model (JSmol): Interactive image
- SMILES: CONC(=O)Nc1ccc(-c2sc3c(c2CN(C)Cc2ccccc2)c(=O)n(-c2ccccc2)c(=O)n3Cc2c(F)cccc2F)cc1
- InChI: InChI=1S/C36H31F2N5O4S/c1-41(20-23-10-5-3-6-11-23)21-28-31-33(44)43(26-12-7-4-8-13-26)36(46)42(22-27-29(37)14-9-15-30(27)38)34(31)48-32(28)24-16-18-25(19-17-24)39-35(45)40-47-2/h3-19H,20-22H2,1-2H3,(H2,39,40,45); Key:UCQSBGOFELXYIN-UHFFFAOYSA-N

Sufugolix (INN, BAN) (developmental code name TAK-013) is a non-peptide, orally-active, selective antagonist of the gonadotropin-releasing hormone receptor (GnRHR) (IC_{50} = 0.1 and 0.06 nM for affinity and in vitro inhibition, respectively). It was under development by Takeda for the treatment of endometriosis and uterine leiomyoma and reached phase II clinical trials for both of these indications, but was subsequently discontinued. It seems to have been supplanted by relugolix (TAK-385), which is also under development by Takeda for the treatment of these conditions and has a more favorable drug profile (including reduced cytochrome P450 inhibition and improved in vivo GnRHR antagonistic activity) in comparison.

Oral administration of sufugolix at a dose of 30 mg/kg to castrated male cynomolgus monkeys resulted in nearly complete suppression of luteinizing hormone levels. The duration of action was more than 24 hours, indicating a long elimination half-life of the drug. The suppressive effects of sufugolix on gonadotropin and sex hormone levels are rapidly reversible with discontinuation.

Unlike various other GnRHR antagonists, sufugolix has been elucidated to be a non-competitive or insurmountable/trapping antagonist of the GnRHR rather than a competitive antagonist.

== See also ==
- Gonadotropin-releasing hormone receptor § Antagonists
