= Steven M. Weinreb =

American chemist

- Born: May 10, 1941 (age 85)
- Education: Cornell University A.B. 1963; University of Rochester Ph.D. 1967
- Known for: Weinreb ketone synthesis
- Scientific career
- Fields: Organic chemistry Natural products synthesis
- Workplaces: The Pennsylvania State University
- Doctoral advisor: Marshall D. Gates, Jr

Steven M. Weinreb (born May 10, 1941) is an American chemist and is a professor of chemistry at Pennsylvania State University in United States. Together with Steven Nahm, he developed the Weinreb ketone synthesis, which allows for mono-addition of an organometallic reagent such as a Grignard reagent or organolithium reagent to an amide.

Weinreb received his PhD for work with Marshall Gates at the University of Rochester in 1967. After post-docs with Gilbert Stork and George H. Buchi, he worked at Fordham University. He joined the Pennsylvania State University in 1978, where he holds the Russell and Mildred Marker Professor of Natural Products Chemistry chair.
