= N-Methylhydroxylamine =

- N-methylhydroxylamine

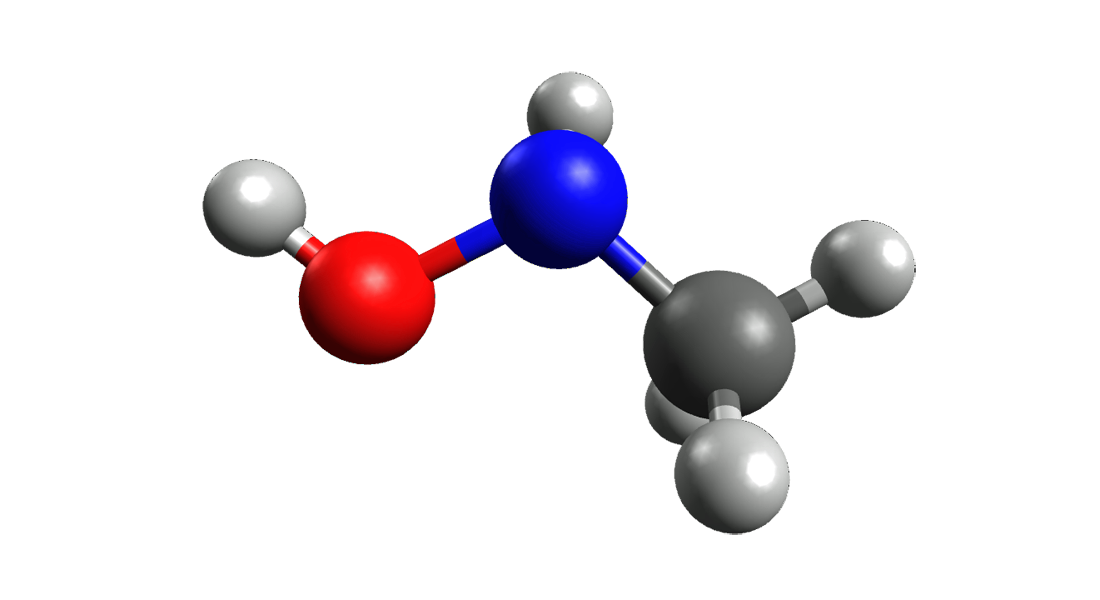
- N-methylhydroxylamine

Names
- Preferred IUPAC name N-Hydroxymethanamine
- Other names Methylhydroxylamine

Identifiers
CAS Number	593-77-1 (Free material); 4229-44-1 (hydrochloride)
3D model (JSmol)	Interactive image
ChemSpider	11157
PubChem CID	11647
UNII	V8920J3L6R (Free material); MGW04SJ1LZ (hydrochloride)
CompTox Dashboard (EPA)	DTXSID10208035
- InChI: InChI=1S/CH5NO/c1-2-3/h2-3H,1H3 Key: CPQCSJYYDADLCZ-UHFFFAOYSA-N
- SMILES: CNO

Properties
Chemical formula	CH_{5}NO
Molar mass	47.057 g·mol^{−1}
Melting point	38.5 °C (101.3 °F; 311.6 K)
Boiling point	115.0 °C (239.0 °F; 388.1 K)
Basicity (pK_{b})	8.04
- Except where otherwise noted, data are given for materials in their standard state (at 25 °C [77 °F], 100 kPa). Infobox references

N-Methylhydroxylamine or methylhydroxylamine is a hydroxylamine derivative with a methyl group replacing one of the hydrogens of the amino group. It is an isomer of methoxyamine and aminomethanol. It decomposes in an exothermic reaction (-63 kJ/mol) into methane and azanone unless stored as a hydrochloride salt.

The compound is commercially available as its hydrochloride salt. This can be produced by electrochemical reduction of nitromethane in hydrochloric acid using a copper anode and a graphite cathode.

== See also ==
- Methoxyamine
