= Methoxyamine =

- Methoxyamine

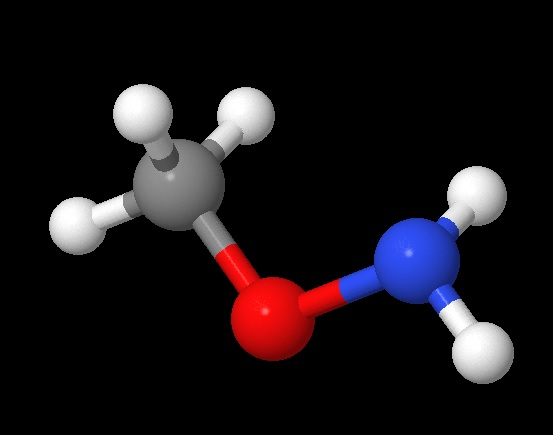
- Methoxyamine

Names
- Preferred IUPAC name O-Methylhydroxylamine
- Other names Methoxylamine; (Aminooxy)methane

Identifiers
CAS Number	67-62-9
3D model (JSmol)	Interactive image
ChEMBL	ChEMBL1213633
ChemSpider	3970
DrugBank	DB06328
ECHA InfoCard	100.000.600
EC Number	200-660-1
PubChem CID	4113
UNII	9TZH4WY30J
CompTox Dashboard (EPA)	DTXSID8043862
- InChI: InChI=1S/CH5NO/c1-3-2/h2H2,1H3 Key: GMPKIPWJBDOURN-UHFFFAOYSA-N
- SMILES: CON

Properties
Chemical formula	CH_{5}NO
Molar mass	47.057 g·mol^{−1}
Appearance	Colorless liquid
Odor	Ammoniacal
Melting point	−86.4 °C (−123.5 °F; 186.8 K)
Boiling point	48.1 °C (118.6 °F; 321.2 K)
Solubility in water	Miscible
Vapor pressure	297.5 mmHg at 25°C
Refractive index (n_{D})	1.4164

Hazards
- GHS labelling
Pictograms	(GHS05: Corrosive) (GHS07: Exclamation mark)
Signal word	Danger
Hazard statements	H302, H312, H314, H332
Precautionary statements	P260, P264, P264+P265, P270, P271, P280, P301+P317, P301+P330+P331, P302+P352, P302+P361+P354, P304+P340, P305+P354+P338, P316, P317, P321, P330, P362+P364, P363, P405, P501
NFPA 704 (fire diamond)	3 1 1
Safety data sheet (SDS)	Santa Cruz (HCl)
- Except where otherwise noted, data are given for materials in their standard state (at 25 °C [77 °F], 100 kPa). Infobox references

Methoxyamine is the organic compound with the formula CH_{3}ONH_{2}. Also called O-methylhydroxylamine, it is a colourless volatile liquid that is soluble in polar organic solvent and in water. It is a derivative of hydroxylamine with the hydroxyl hydrogen replaced by a methyl group, an alkoxyamine. Alternatively, it can be viewed as a derivative of methanol with the hydroxyl hydrogen replaced by an amino group. It is an isomer of N-methylhydroxylamine and aminomethanol.

== Synthesis ==
Methoxyamine is prepared via O-alkylation of hydroxylamine derivatives. For example, it is obtained by O-methylation of acetone oxime followed by hydrolysis of the O-methylated oxime:

(CH_{3})_{2}CNOCH_{3} + H_{2}O → (CH_{3})_{2}CO + H_{2}NOCH_{3}

The other broad method involves methanolysis of hydroxylamine sulfonates:

H_{2}NOSO_{3}^{−} + CH_{3}OH → H_{2}NOCH_{3} + HSO_{4}^{−}

Commercial products are usually the hydrochloride salt.

== Reactions ==
Analogous to the behavior of hydroxylamine, methoxyamine condenses with ketones and aldehydes to give imines.

Methoxyamine is used as a synthon for NH_{2}^{+}. It undergoes deprotonation by methyl lithium to give CH_{3}ONHLi. This N-lithio derivative is attacked by organolithium compounds to give, after hydrolysis, amines:

H_{2}NOCH_{3} + CH_{3}Li → LiHNOCH_{3} + CH_{4}
LiHNOCH_{3} + RLi → RNHLi + LiOCH_{3}
RNHLi + H_{2}O → RNH_{2} + LiOH

== Uses ==
Methoxyamine has potential medicinal uses. It covalently binds to apurinic/apyrimidinic (AP) DNA damage sites and inhibits base excision repair (BER), which may result in an increase in DNA strand breaks and apoptosis.This agent may potentiate the anti-tumor activity of alkylating agents.

Examples of drugs incorporating the methoxyamine unit are brasofensine and gemifloxacin.
