= O-Octadecylhydroxylamine =

Names
- IUPAC name O-Octadecylhydroxylamine
- Other names: 1-(Aminooxy)octadecane

Identifiers
3D model (JSmol)	Interactive image
ChemSpider	292737
PubChem CID	330458
- InChI: InChI=1S/C18H39NO/c1-2-3-4-5-6-7-8-9-10-11-12-13-14-15-16-17-18-20-19/h2-19H2,1H3; Key: NWGNCXZRVUMBAL-UHFFFAOYSA-N
- SMILES: CCCCCCCCCCCCCCCCCCON

Properties
Chemical formula	C_{18}H_{39}NO
Molar mass	285.516 g·mol^{−1}
Appearance	Fluffy white solid
Density	0.9±0.1 g/cm^{3}
log P	8.307
Vapor pressure	0.0±0.9 mmHg (25 °C)
- Except where otherwise noted, data are given for materials in their standard state (at 25 °C [77 °F], 100 kPa). Infobox references

O-Octadecylhydroxylamine (ODHA) is a white solid organic compound with the formula C_{18}H_{39}NO. ODHA is a noncanonical lipid, which contains a saturated alkyl tail and an aminooxy headgroup. This noncanonical lipid can be site selectively appended to the N-terminal of desired biopolymers such as peptides. ODHA drives the supramolecular assembly of modified protein, presumably through the hydrophobic collapse of ODHA chains.

== Preparation ==
ODHA is prepared from the reaction between 2-(octadecyloxy)isoindoline-1,3-dione and hydrazine hydrate.

== Reaction ==
=== ODHA modification ===
A pH-responsive oxime bond is used to install an ODHA-type synthetic lipid (octadecylhydroxylamine) in place of the N terminal serine residue in N-myristoylation PTM. N-terminal myristoylation is a post-translational modification carried out by the enzyme N-myristoyltransferase. Generally, the 12-carbon myristoyl lipid is added to the N-terminus of proteins. The lipid is attached to the protein via a stable amide bond. However, the ODHA lipid is attached to the protein via an oxime bond, due to the structure of the non-canonical lipid. The reaction is chemical, compared to the enzymatic NMT reaction. Self-assembly is driven by the hydrophobic nature of the attached lipid, and disassembly is controlled by oxime degradation in an acidic environment. The reaction between the lipid and oxidized protein is biomolecular, which means it is following second order rate kinetics since it is dependent on oxidized protein (ELP) and lipids (ODHA).

$${d[ODHA-ELP] \over dt}=K[ELP][ODHA]$$
