= Aminomethanol =

- Methanolamine structural formula

Names
- Preferred IUPAC name Aminomethanol
- Other names Methanolamine

Identifiers
CAS Number	3088-27-5
3D model (JSmol)	Interactive image
ChemSpider	4925662
PubChem CID	6420096
UNII	T8C993J0UB
CompTox Dashboard (EPA)	DTXSID50184884
- InChI: InChI=1S/CH5NO/c2-1-3/h3H,1-2H2 Key: XMYQHJDBLRZMLW-UHFFFAOYSA-N; InChI=1/CH5NO/c2-1-3/h3H,1-2H2 Key: XMYQHJDBLRZMLW-UHFFFAOYAU
- SMILES: C(N)O

Properties
Chemical formula	CH_{5}NO
Molar mass	47.057 g·mol^{−1}
Appearance	Colorless liquid
- Except where otherwise noted, data are given for materials in their standard state (at 25 °C [77 °F], 100 kPa). verify (what is ?) Infobox references

Aminomethanol or methanolamine is the amino alcohol with the chemical formula of H_{2}NCH_{2}OH. With an amino group and an alcohol group on the same carbon atom, the compound is also an hemiaminal.

In aqueous solution, methanolamine exists in equilibrium with formaldehyde and ammonia. It is an intermediate en route to hexamethylenetetramine. The reaction can be conducted in gas phase and in solution.
