= Pharmacokinetics of estradiol =

Clinical data
- Routes of administration: • By mouth (tablet) • Sublingual (tablet) • Intranasal (nasal spray) • Transdermal (patch, gel, cream, emulsion, spray) • Vaginal (tablet, cream, suppository, insert, ring) • IM injection (oil solution) • SC injection (aq. soln.) • Subcutaneous implant
- Drug class: Estrogen; Antigonadotropin

Pharmacokinetic data
- Bioavailability: Oral: 5% (0.1–12%); SL: 10% (in marmosets); IM: 100%
- Protein binding: ~98%: • Albumin: 60% • SHBG: 38% • Free: 2%
- Metabolism: Liver (via hydroxylation, sulfation, glucuronidation)
- Metabolites: Major (90%): • Estrone • Estrone sulfate • Estrone glucuronide • Estradiol glucuronide
- Elimination half-life: Oral: 13–20 hours Sublingual: 8–18 hours Transdermal (gel): 37 hours IM (as EB): 2–3 days IM (as EV): 4–5 days IM (as EC): 8–10 days IV (as E2): 0.5–2 hours
- Excretion: Urine: 54% Feces: 6%

The pharmacology of estradiol, an estrogen medication and naturally occurring steroid hormone, concerns its pharmacodynamics, pharmacokinetics, and various routes of administration.

Estradiol is a naturally occurring and bioidentical estrogen, or an agonist of the estrogen receptor, the biological target of estrogens like endogenous estradiol. Due to its estrogenic activity, estradiol has antigonadotropic effects and can inhibit fertility and suppress sex hormone production in both women and men. Estradiol differs from non-bioidentical estrogens like conjugated estrogens and ethinylestradiol in various ways, with implications for tolerability and safety.

Estradiol can be taken by mouth, held under the tongue, as a gel or patch that is applied to the skin, in through the vagina, by injection into muscle or fat, or through the use of an implant that is placed into fat, among other routes.

== Routes of administration ==
Estradiol can be taken by a variety of different routes of administration. These include oral, buccal, sublingual, intranasal, transdermal (gels, creams, patches), vaginal (tablets, creams, rings, suppositories), rectal, by intramuscular or subcutaneous injection (in oil or aqueous), and as a subcutaneous implant. The pharmacokinetics of estradiol, including its bioavailability, metabolism, biological half-life, and other parameters, differ by route of administration. Likewise, the potency of estradiol, and its local effects in certain tissues, most importantly the liver, differ by route of administration as well. In particular, the oral route is subject to a high first-pass effect, which results in high levels of estradiol and consequent estrogenic effects in the liver and low potency due to first-pass hepatic and intestinal metabolism into metabolites like estrone and estrogen conjugates. Conversely, this is not the case for parenteral (non-oral) routes, which bypass the intestines and liver.

Different estradiol routes and dosages can achieve widely varying circulating estradiol levels (see the table below). For purposes of comparison with normal physiological circumstances, menstrual cycle circulating levels of estradiol in premenopausal women are 40 pg/mL in the early follicular phase, 250 pg/mL at the middle of the cycle, and 100 pg/mL during the mid-luteal phase. Mean integrated levels of circulating estradiol in premenopausal women across the whole menstrual cycle are in the range of 80 to 150 pg/mL, according to some sources. In postmenopausal women, circulating levels of estradiol are below 15 pg/mL. During normal human pregnancy, estrogen production increases progressively and extremely high estrogen levels are attained. Estradiol levels range from 1,000 to 40,000 pg/mL across pregnancy, are on average 25,000 pg/mL at term, and reach levels as high as 75,000 pg/mL in some women.

Available forms of estradiol (Note: This table includes primarily products available as a single-ingredient estradiol preparation—thus excluding compounds with progestogens or other ingredients included. The table furthermore does not include compounded drugs—only commercially produced products. Availability of each product varies by country.)
Route	Ingredient	Form	Dose (Note: Doses are given per unit (ex: per tablet, per mL).)	Brand names (Note: Other brand names may be manufactured or previously manufactured.)
Oral	Estradiol	Tablet	0.1, 0.2, 0.5, 1, 2, 4 mg	Estrace, Ovocyclin
Oral	Estradiol valerate	Tablet	0.5, 1, 2, 4 mg	Progynova
Transdermal	Estradiol	Patch	14, 25, 37.5, 50, 60, 75, 100 µg/d	Climara, Vivelle
Transdermal	Estradiol	Gel pump	0.06% (0.52, 0.75 mg/pump)	Elestrin, EstroGel
Transdermal	Estradiol	Gel packet	0.1% (0.25, 0.5, 1.0 mg/pk.)	DiviGel, Sandrena
Transdermal	Estradiol	Emulsion	0.25% (25 µg/pouch)	Estrasorb
Transdermal	Estradiol	Spray	1.53 mg/spray	Evamist, Lenzetto
Vaginal	Estradiol	Tablet	10, 25 µg	Vagifem
Vaginal	Estradiol	Cream	0.01% (0.1 mg/gram)	Estrace
Vaginal	Estradiol	Insert	4, 10 µg	Imvexxy
Vaginal	Estradiol	Ring	2 mg/ring (7.5 µg/d, 3 mon.)	Estring
Vaginal	Estradiol acetate	Ring	50, 100 µg/d, 3 months	Femring
Injection (Note: By intramuscular or subcutaneous injection.)	Estradiol	Microspheres	1 mg/mL	Juvenum E
Injection	Estradiol benzoate	Oil solution	0.167, 0.2, 0.333, 1, 1.67, 2, 5, 10, 20, 25 mg/mL	Progynon-B
Injection	Estradiol cypionate	Oil solution	1, 3, 5 mg/mL	Depo-Estradiol
Injection	Estradiol valerate	Oil solution	5, 10, 20, 40 mg/mL	Progynon Depot
Implant	Estradiol	Pellet	20, 25, 50, 100 mg, 6 mon.	Estradiol Implants
Notes and sources: Sources:

Estrogen levels after a single dose of estradiol by different routes
Route	Dose (mg)	Time measured	ΔE2 levels (pg/mL)	ΔE1 levels (pg/mL)	E2:E1 ratio
Oral	1; 2; 4	12 h 3 h 6 h	+25 +40 +50	+150 +250 +500	0.15; 0.16; 0.10
Sublingual	1; 0.5; 0.5; 0.5	1 h 1 h 1 h 1 h	+450 +250 +750 +75	+160 +85 +250 +24	3; 3; 3; 3
Intranasal	1	1 h	+110	+110	1.0
Topical (gel)	3; 3/d 3/2 d	5 h 12–20 h 12 h 36 h	+70 +45–279 +300–1310 +20–179	+50 +31–230 +24–110 +120–500	0.4; 1; 1; 1
Vaginal (cream)	0.5; 1.0	3 h 3 h	+830 +800	+150 +150	5.0; 5.0
Rectal	1	3 h	+620	+120	5.0
Intramuscular inj. (oil soln.)	EB: 5 EV: 5 EC: 5 EU: 100; PEP: 320	1.8, 2.4 d^{a} 2.2, 2.7 d^{a} 3.9, 5.1 d^{a} 1 d 16, 25 d^{a}	940^{b} 667^{b} 338^{b} 500^{b} 270^{b}	343^{b} 324^{b} 145^{b} ND; 1000^{b}	2.7; 2.1; 2.3; ND; 0.27
Intravenous inj.	0.3	5 min	8321^{b}	960^{b}	8.7
Footnotes: ^{a} = T_{max} for E2, E1 levels. ^{b} = Actual levels (not change). Sources: See template.

=== Oral administration ===
==== Absorption and bioavailability ====
The oral bioavailability of estradiol is very low. This is due to the fact that estradiol is poorly soluble in water, which limits its dissolution and absorption, and is additionally subject to extensive metabolism during the first pass through the intestines and liver. Estradiol is micronized and/or conjugated with an ester, as in estradiol valerate or estradiol acetate, to improve its oral bioavailability and potency. Micronization decreases the particle size of estradiol crystals and hence increases the surface area for absorption, thereby improving the rate and extent of absorption. In addition, there is an improvement in metabolic stability. Oral micronized estradiol consists of more than 80% of estradiol particles micronized to a size smaller than 20 μm in diameter, or to about 1 to 3 μm on average. All oral formulations of estradiol available today are micronized, and oral estradiol valerate tablets also seem to be micronized.

Oral non-micronized estradiol and oral micronized estradiol do not appear to have ever been directly compared in a study. Both have been assessed independently however, and have been found to produce significant estrogenic effects. Micronization of other poorly water-soluble steroids such as spironolactone and norethisterone acetate has been found to increase their potency by several-fold. In accordance, studies of the amount of oral estradiol necessary for endometrial proliferation in women have reported a total dose of 60 mg for micronized estradiol relative to 120 to 300 mg or more for non-micronized estradiol. As such, micronization has been said to substantially improve the potency of oral estradiol.

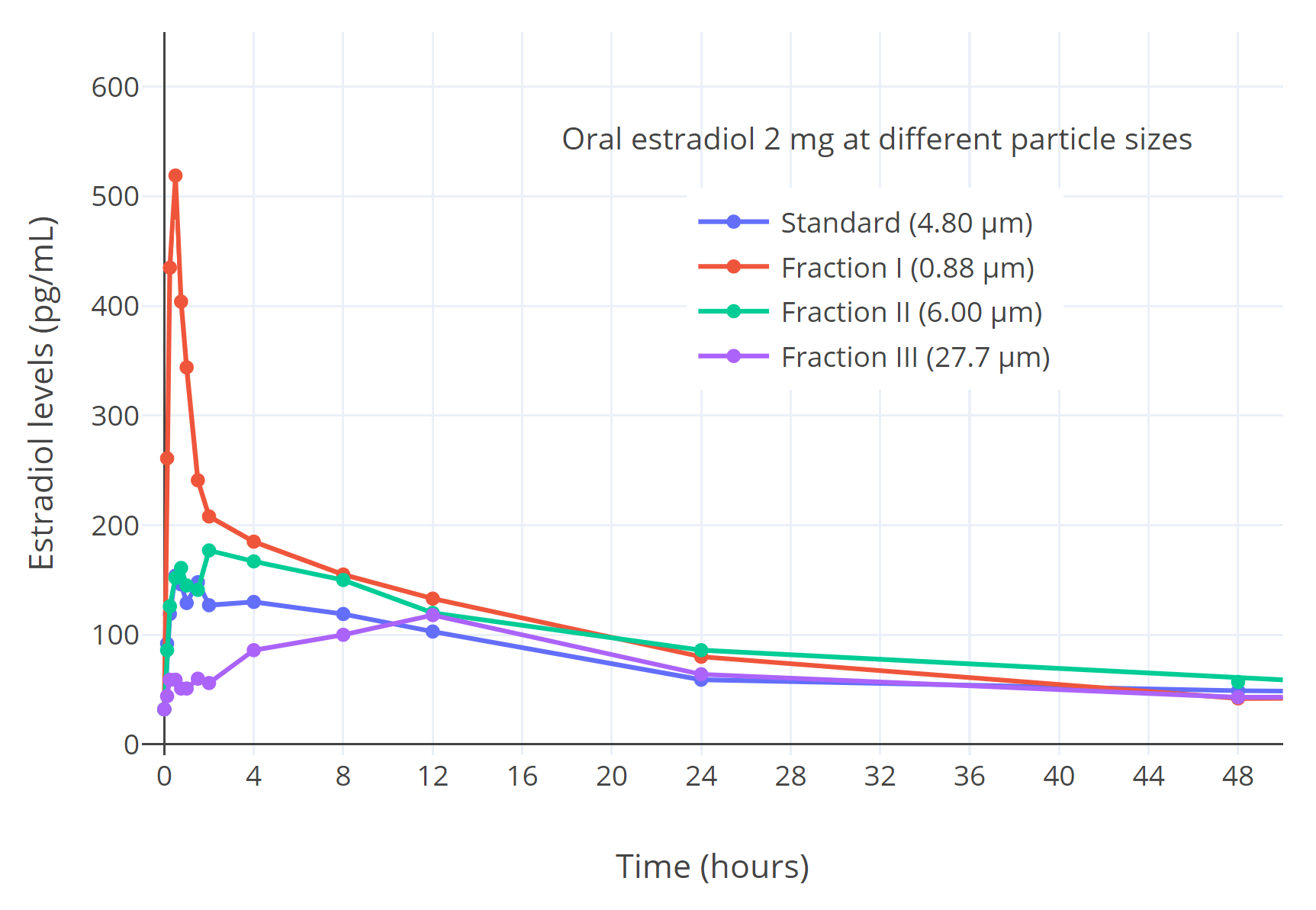
Estradiol levels with a single 2 mg dose of oral estradiol micronized to different particle sizes in postmenopausal women.

A study compared different particle sizes of oral micronized estradiol. A preparation with the smallest particles (mainly <0.6 μm) was found to have the most rapid absorption and the highest bioavailability. However, a sharp peak in estradiol levels, without an accompanying rise in estrone levels, was observed during the first 2 hours with this particle size. It was suggested that the smallest estradiol particles may have been absorbed by the lymphatic system, partially bypassing first-pass metabolism and resulting in very high initial estradiol levels. The preparations with the larger particle sizes (mainly <3.5 μm and <20 μm) were found to be absorbed more slowly, without a pronounced initial peak in estradiol levels. Levels of estradiol were more even and similar to physiological levels with these particle sizes. Differences in area-under-the-curve estradiol levels with the different particle sizes were relatively small. As such, micronization may improve absorption but does not necessarily improve therapeutic effect.

Micronized estradiol is rapidly and completely absorbed with oral administration. This is true for oral doses of 2 mg and 4 mg, but absorption was found to be incomplete for an oral dose of 8 mg. This dose showed 76% of the expected bioavailability based on dose proportionality and area-under-the-curve levels, indicating a small deviation from linearity. The absolute bioavailability of oral micronized estradiol is approximately 5%, with a possible range of 0.1% to 12%. As such, the bioavailability of oral estradiol is very low even with micronization. There is high interindividual variability in the levels of estradiol achieved with oral estradiol, which is likely related to the high first-pass effect. This variation has been reported to be in the range of 28 to 127%, or about 4.6-fold maximal difference in levels between individuals, in terms of mean area-under-the-curve levels of estradiol.

In postmenopausal women, a dosage of 1 mg/day oral micronized estradiol has been found to produce circulating concentrations of 30 to 50 pg/mL estradiol and 150 to 300 pg/mL estrone, while a dosage of 2 mg/day has been found to result in circulating levels of 50 to 180 pg/mL estradiol and 300 to 850 pg/mL estrone. A study of oral micronized estradiol in transgender women found that mean estradiol levels across a dosage range of 1 to 8 mg/day were about 50 pg/mL at 1 mg/day, 100 pg/mL at 4 mg/day, and 150 pg/mL at 8 mg/day, with a wide degree of variation. In another study, mean estradiol levels at steady state with 4 mg/day and 6 mg/day oral micronized estradiol were approximately 180 pg/mL and 265 pg/mL, respectively. A study that used high to very high-dose oral micronized estradiol in postmenopausal women found that steady-state estradiol levels with 6 mg/day were about 300 pg/mL and with 30 mg/day were about 2,400 pg/mL.

Estradiol valerate is rapidly hydrolyzed into estradiol in the intestines. For this reason, oral estradiol and oral estradiol valerate have very similar pharmacokinetics. Due to the presence of its valeric acid ester and differences in molecular weight, estradiol valerate contains about 76% of the same amount of estradiol by weight. As a result, 2 mg oral estradiol valerate produces equivalent estradiol levels to about 1.5 mg oral estradiol.

Potencies of oral estrogens
Compound	Dosage for specific uses (mg usually) (Note: Dosages are given in milligrams unless otherwise noted.)					
Compound	ETD (Note: Dosed every 2 to 3 weeks)	EPD	MSD	MSD (Note: Dosed daily)	OID	TSD
Estradiol (non-micronized)	30	≥120–300	120	6	-	-
Estradiol (micronized)	6–12	60–80	14–42	1–2	>5	>8
Estradiol valerate	6–12	60–80	14–42	1–2	-	>8
Estradiol benzoate	-	60–140	-	-	-	-
Estriol	≥20	120–150 (Note: In divided doses, 3x/day; irregular and atypical proliferation.)	28–126	1–6	>5	-
Estriol succinate	-	140–150	28–126	2–6	-	-
Estrone sulfate	12	60	42	2	-	-
Conjugated estrogens	5–12	60–80	8.4–25	0.625–1.25	>3.75	7.5
Ethinylestradiol	200 μg	1–2	280 μg	20–40 μg	100 μg	100 μg
Mestranol	300 μg	1.5–3.0	300–600 μg	25–30 μg	>80 μg	-
Quinestrol	300 μg	2–4	500 μg	25–50 μg	-	-
Methylestradiol	-	2	-	-	-	-
Diethylstilbestrol	2.5	20–30	11	0.5–2.0	>5	3
DES dipropionate	-	15–30	-	-	-	-
Dienestrol	5	30–40	42	0.5–4.0	-	-
Dienestrol diacetate	3–5	30–60	-	-	-	-
Hexestrol	-	70–110	-	-	-	-
Chlorotrianisene	-	>100	-	-	>48	-
Methallenestril	-	400	-	-	-	-
Sources and footnotes:

Relative oral potencies of estrogens
Estrogen	HF	VE	UCa	FSH	LH	HDL-C	SHBG	CBG	AGT	Liver
Estradiol	1.0	1.0	1.0	1.0	1.0	1.0	1.0	1.0	1.0	1.0
Estrone	?	?	?	0.3	0.3	?	?	?	?	?
Estriol	0.3	0.3	0.1	0.3	0.3	0.2	?	?	?	0.67
Estrone sulfate	?	0.9	0.9	0.8–0.9	0.9	0.5	0.9	0.5–0.7	1.4–1.5	0.56–1.7
Conjugated estrogens	1.2	1.5	2.0	1.1–1.3	1.0	1.5	3.0–3.2	1.3–1.5	5.0	1.3–4.5
Equilin sulfate	?	?	1.0	?	?	6.0	7.5	6.0	7.5	?
Ethinylestradiol	120	150	400	60–150	100	400	500–600	500–600	350	2.9–5.0
Diethylstilbestrol	?	?	?	2.9–3.4	?	?	26–28	25–37	20	5.7–7.5
Sources and footnotes Notes: Values are ratios, with estradiol as standard (i.e., 1.0). Abbreviations: HF = Clinical relief of hot flashes. VE = Increased proliferation of vaginal epithelium. UCa = Decrease in UCa. FSH = Suppression of FSH levels. LH = Suppression of LH levels. HDL-C, SHBG, CBG, and AGT = Increase in the serum levels of these liver proteins. Liver = Ratio of liver estrogenic effects to general/systemic estrogenic effects (hot flashes/gonadotropins). Sources: See template.

==== Metabolism and elimination ====
When taken orally, about 95% of a dose of estradiol is metabolized in the intestines and liver into estrone and estrogen conjugates such as estrone sulfate, estrone glucuronide, and estradiol sulfate, among others, prior to entering the circulation. As a result, circulating estrone and estrogen conjugate levels are markedly elevated, in a highly unphysiological manner, with oral estradiol. Whereas the ratio of circulating estradiol to estrone is about 1:1 in premenopausal women and with transdermal estradiol, oral estradiol produces a ratio of about 1:5 on average and as high as 1:20 in some women. In addition, whereas levels of estradiol with menopausal replacement dosages of oral estradiol are in the range of the follicular phase of the normal menstrual cycle, levels of estrone resemble those during the first trimester of pregnancy. Moreover, whereas normal physiological estrone sulfate levels are 10 to 25 times higher than those of estradiol and estrone in premenopausal women, levels of estrone sulfate with oral estradiol are an additional 8 to 20 times higher than normal premenopausal or postmenopausal estrone sulfate levels. One study found that estrone sulfate levels were 200-fold higher than estradiol levels with 2 mg/day oral micronized estradiol or oral estradiol valerate, and estrone sulfate levels can reach up to nearly 1,000-fold higher concentrations than estradiol in some cases. In contrast to oral estradiol, due to the lack of the first pass, an excess in estrone and estrogen conjugate levels does not occur with transdermal estradiol or other parenteral estradiol routes.

The transformation of estradiol into estrone and estrogen conjugates is reversible. As such, these metabolites can be converted back into estradiol. About 15% of orally administered estradiol is transformed into estrone and 65% into estrone sulfate. About 5% of estrone and 1.4% of estrone sulfate is converted back into estradiol. An additional 21% of estrone sulfate is converted into estrone, whereas transformation of estrone into estrone sulfate is approximately 54%. The interconversion between estradiol and estrone is mediated by 17β-hydroxysteroid dehydrogenases (17β-HSDs), whereas the conversion of estrone into estrone sulfate is mediated by estrogen sulfotransferases (ESTs) and the transformation of estrone sulfate into estrone by steroid sulfatase (STS). The metabolic clearance rates and hence blood half-lives of estrogen conjugates like estrone sulfate are much longer than those of estradiol and estrone. Estrogen conjugates, primarily estrone sulfate, serve as a large circulating reservoir for estradiol, and because of this, they function to greatly extend the biological half-life of oral estradiol. As such, the biological half-life of oral estradiol is a composite parameter that is dependent on interconversion between estradiol and estrogen conjugates, as well as on enterohepatic recirculation. Whereas the biological half-life of estradiol given by intravenous injection is about 0.5 to 2 hours, the biological half-life of oral estradiol has a range of 13 to 20 hours due to the large and long-lasting pool of estrogen conjugates that is formed during first-pass metabolism and that serves to continuously replenish circulating estradiol levels.

==== First-pass effect and differences from other routes ====
The first-pass effect that occurs with oral estradiol results in unusually high levels of estrone and estrogen conjugates in the circulation as well as of estradiol in the liver. These unique properties of oral estradiol result in a number of pharmacological differences relative to the other routes of administration of estradiol.

The high levels of estrone and estrogen conjugates that occur with oral estradiol raise the question of the pharmacodynamic significance of these metabolites. In contrast to estradiol however, estrone has very low activity as an estrogen. The affinities of estrone for the human ERs and its estrogenic activity have been reported to be approximately 3 to 4% of those of estradiol. In addition, unlike estradiol and estriol, estrone is not accumulated in target tissues. Because estrone can be transformed into estradiol, most of its activity in vivo is actually due to conversion into estradiol. In accordance, doses of oral and transdermal estradiol that achieve similar levels of estradiol have been found, in spite of markedly elevated levels of estrone with oral estradiol but not with transdermal estradiol, to possess equivalent and non-significantly different potency in terms of clinical measures including suppression of LH and FSH levels, inhibition of bone resorption, and relief of menopausal symptoms such as hot flashes. In addition, estradiol levels were found to correlate with these effects, while estrone levels did not. These findings suggest that estrone contributes very little or not at all to the estrogenic potency of estradiol, while also not antagonizing the estrogenic activity of estradiol. This contradicts some cell-free in-vitro research suggesting that high concentrations of estrone might be able to partially antagonize the actions of estradiol.

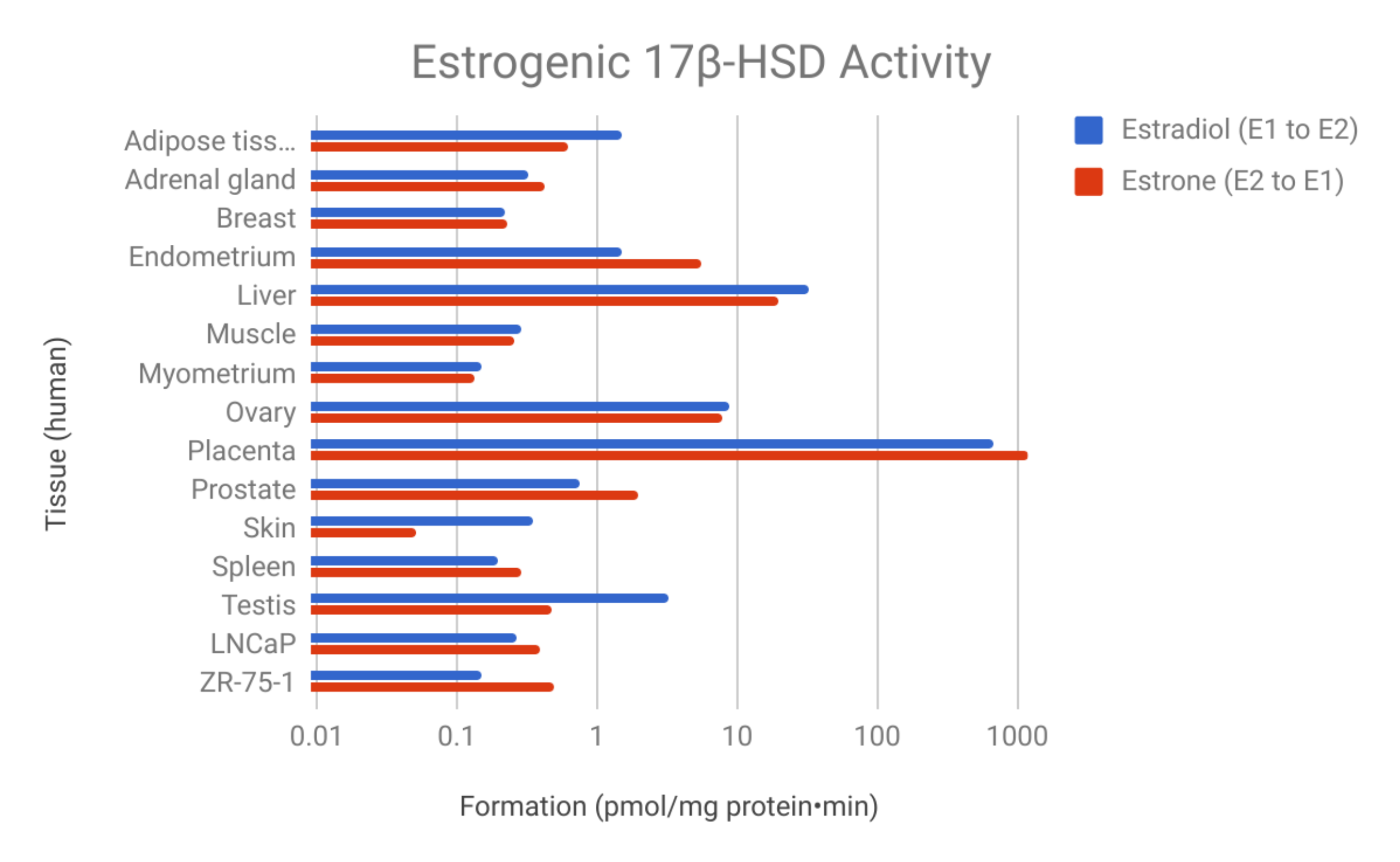
Distribution of 17β-HSD activities for formation of estradiol (E2) versus formation of estrone (E1) in human tissues.

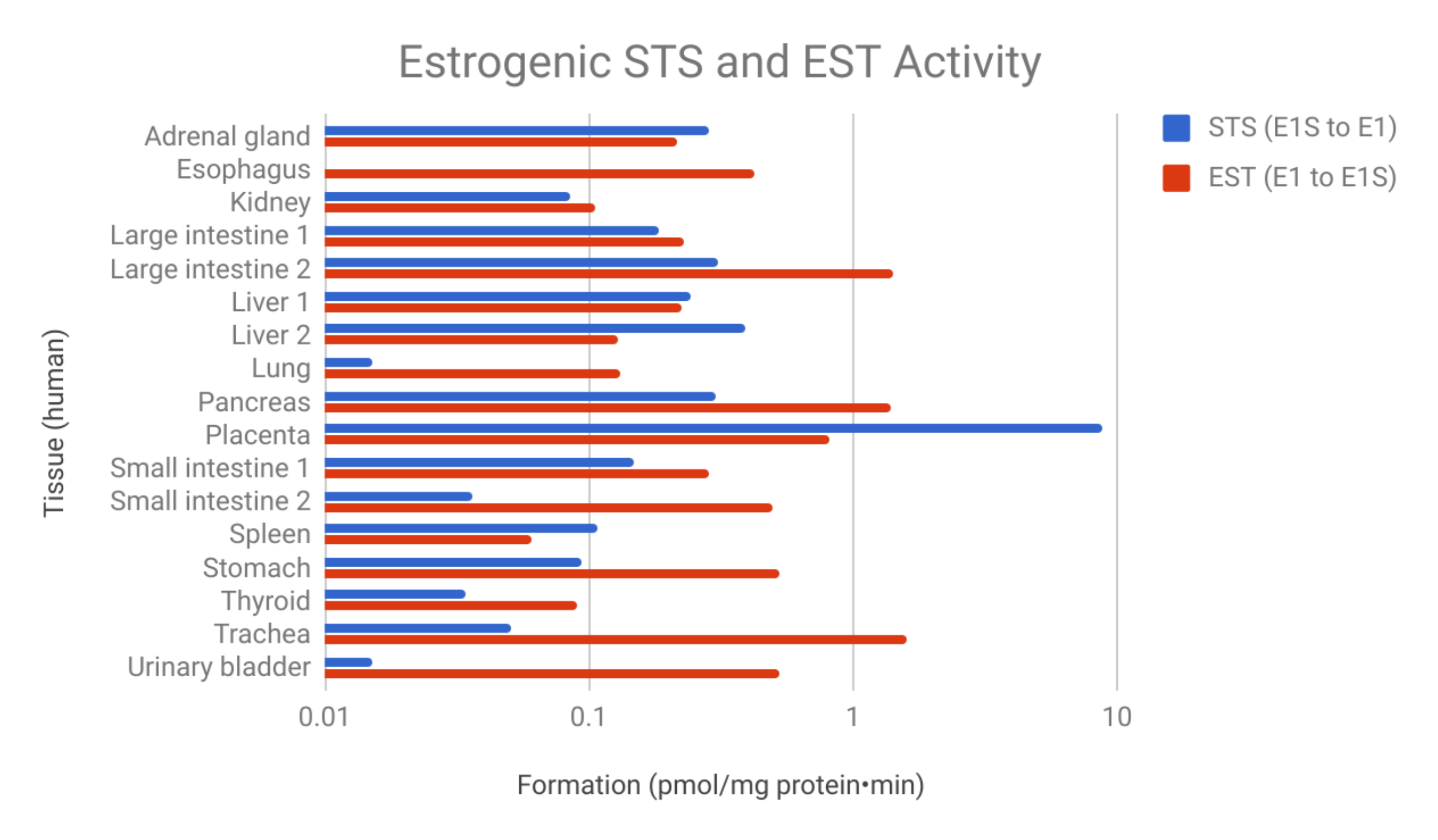
Distribution of STS and EST activities for interconversion of estrone (E1) and estrone sulfate (E1S) in adult human tissues.

Relative activation and inactivation rates of estradiol to and from estrone and estrone sulfate in tissues throughout the body.

On the other hand, it has been suggested by some authors that the high levels of estrone and/or estrone conjugates with oral estradiol may result in excessive estradiol levels in certain tissues such as the breasts and endometrium, due to high expression in these tissues of the requisite enzymes (17β-HSDs and STS) necessary to transform these metabolites back into estradiol. In accordance, circulating levels of estrone sulfate have been found to be positively associated with breast density in postmenopausal women treated with oral estradiol, with 1.3% higher breast density observed for every 1 ng/mL greater level of estrone sulfate. Similarly, levels of estradiol, estrone, and estrone sulfate are all strongly associated with the risk of breast cancer in women. Preclinical studies have shown that estrone sulfate, via local transformation into estradiol, stimulates the growth of mammary cancer cells.

Due to the first pass through the liver, disproportionate and supraphysiological levels of estrogens occur locally in the liver with oral estradiol. These levels are approximately 4- to 5-fold higher than in the circulation, based on differences in hepatic estrogenic potency for oral estradiol relative to transdermal estradiol. As a result, there is abnormally high estrogenic signaling in the liver with oral estradiol, and a variety of unphysiological effects on liver protein synthesis result. Through modulation of liver protein synthesis, conjugated oral estrogen increases the risk of blood clots, increases circulating levels of a variety of binding proteins including thyroid binding globulin (TBG), cortisol binding globulin (CBG), sex hormone binding globulin (SHBG), growth hormone binding protein (GHBP), insulin-like growth factor-binding proteins (IGFBPs), and copper binding protein (CBP), suppresses growth hormone (GH)-mediated insulin-like growth factor 1 (IGF-1) production, and produces positive blood lipid changes, among a variety of other effects. In contrast to oral estradiol, transdermal estradiol has relatively minimal impact on liver protein synthesis. As an example, a study found that 1 mg/day oral estradiol significantly increased SHBG levels by 45%, while 50 μg/day transdermal estradiol increased SHBG levels non-significantly by only 12%.

In the circulation, approximately 38% of estradiol is reversibly bound to SHBG and 60% is reversibly bound to albumin in women under normal physiological circumstances, with 2 to 3% of total estradiol circulating free or unbound at any given time. Only estradiol that is free or unbound is able to be enter target cells and hence is biologically active. The increase in SHBG levels with oral estradiol (e.g., +50%) can result in a clinically meaningful increase in the fractions of sex hormones like estradiol and testosterone that are bound to SHBG, whereas this is not the case with typical clinical dosages of transdermal estradiol. The increase in the fraction of estradiol bound to SHBG results in a significant decrease in the percentage of free or unbound and hence bioactive estradiol. As a result, the bioavailability and potency of oral estradiol may be diminished relative to parenteral estradiol routes by some amount. However, a study found that the free fraction of estradiol was similar with doses of oral and topical estradiol that resulted in equivalent total estradiol levels.

==== Experimental oral formulations ====
Estradiol decanoate, estradiol cyclooctyl acetate, estradiol 3-saccharinylmethyl ether, and EC508 (estradiol 17β-(1-(4-(aminosulfonyl)benzoyl)-L-proline)) are estradiol esters and novel oral forms of estradiol that have been developed with improved properties, such as greater bioavailability and reduced first-pass effect. Estradiol decanoate and estradiol cyclooctyl acetate were studied for potential use in menopausal hormone therapy and birth control pills but were never marketed. EC508 is currently under active development for use in menopausal hormone therapy.

==== Graphs ====
Hormone levels with oral estradiol
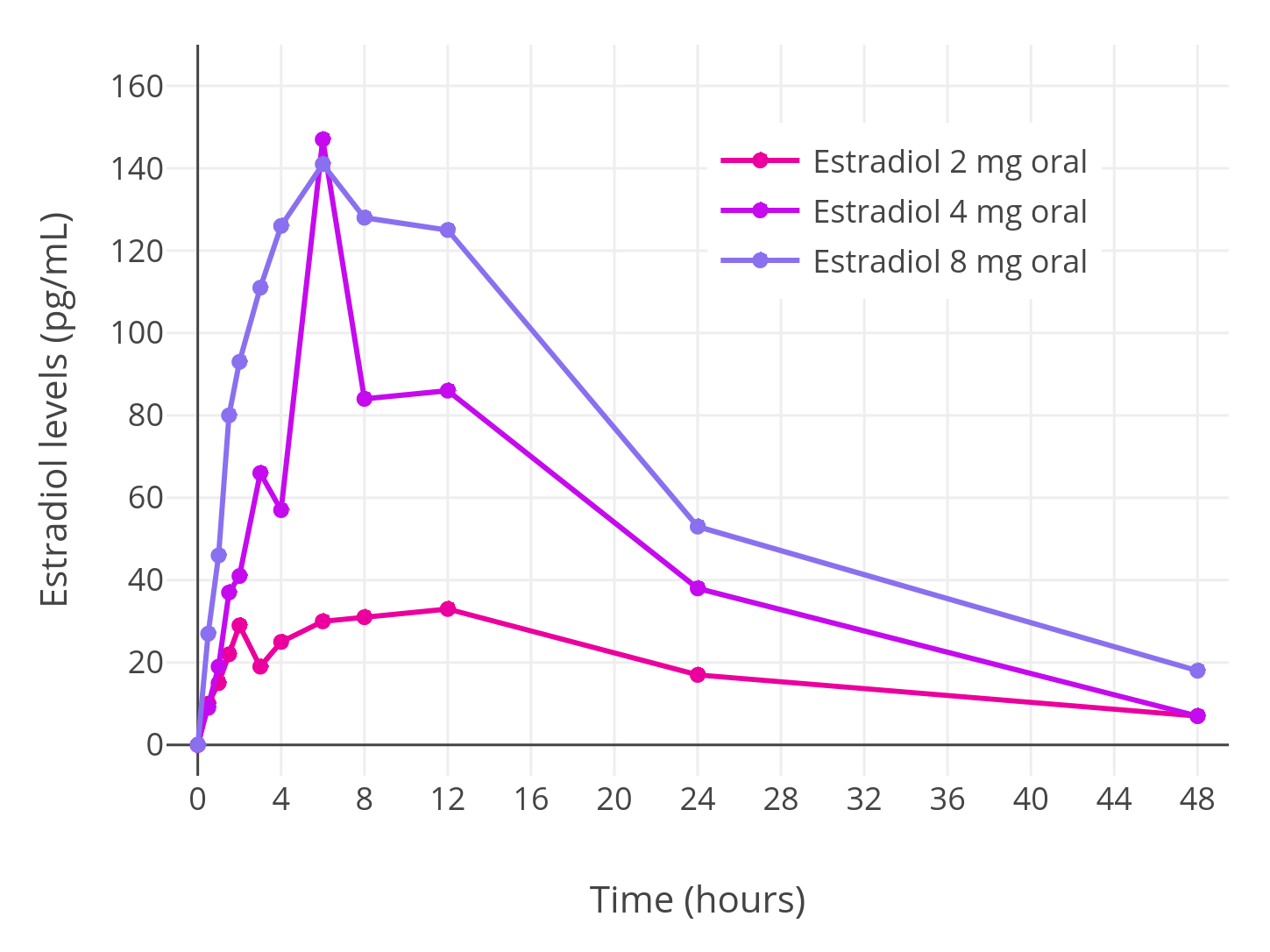
Estradiol levels after a single oral dose of 2, 4, or 8 mg estradiol in premenopausal women.

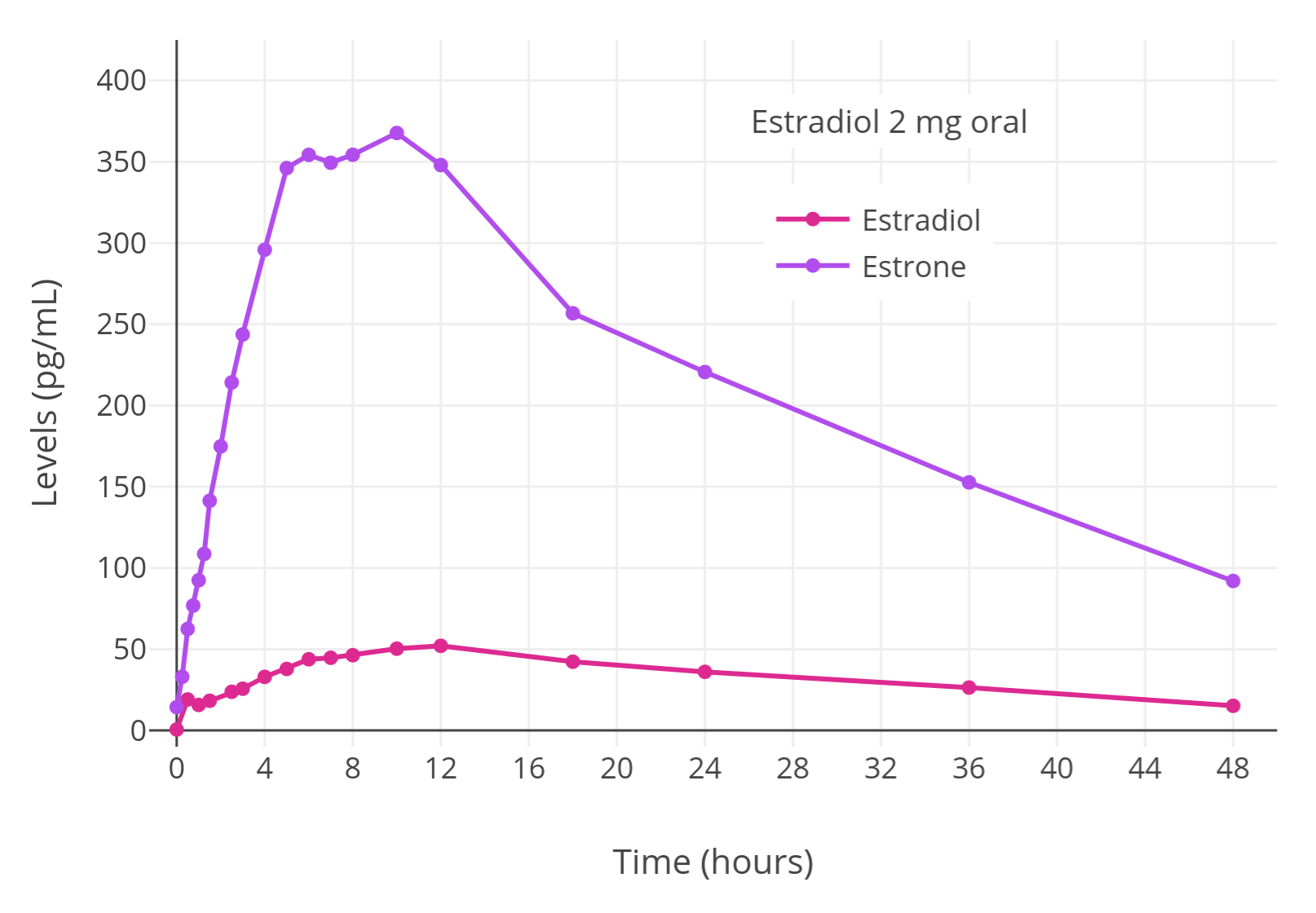
Estradiol and estrone levels following a single 2 mg dose of oral estradiol in postmenopausal women.

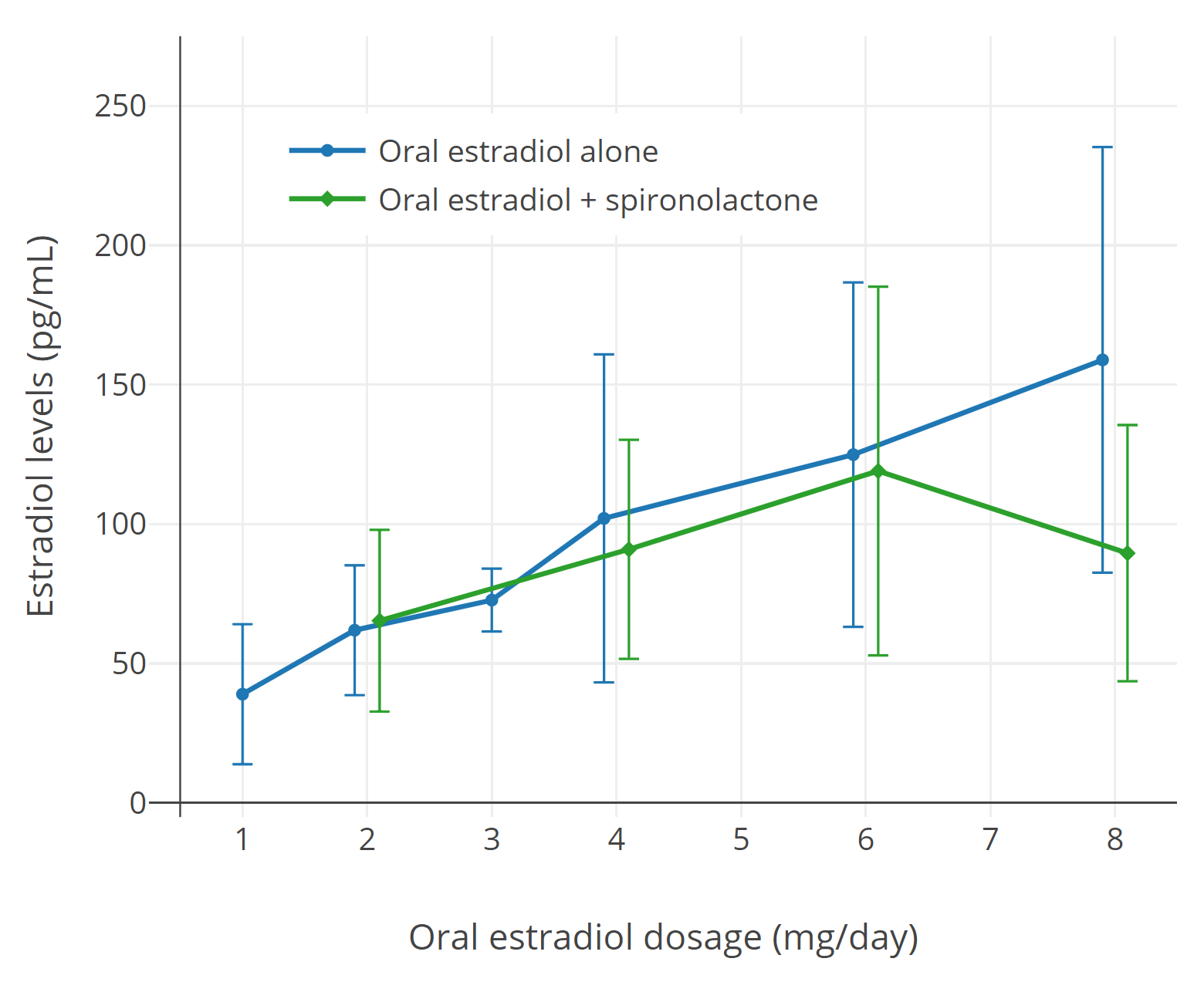
Mean estradiol levels during 1 to 8 mg/day oral estradiol therapy alone or in combination with 100 to 200 mg/day spironolactone in transgender women.

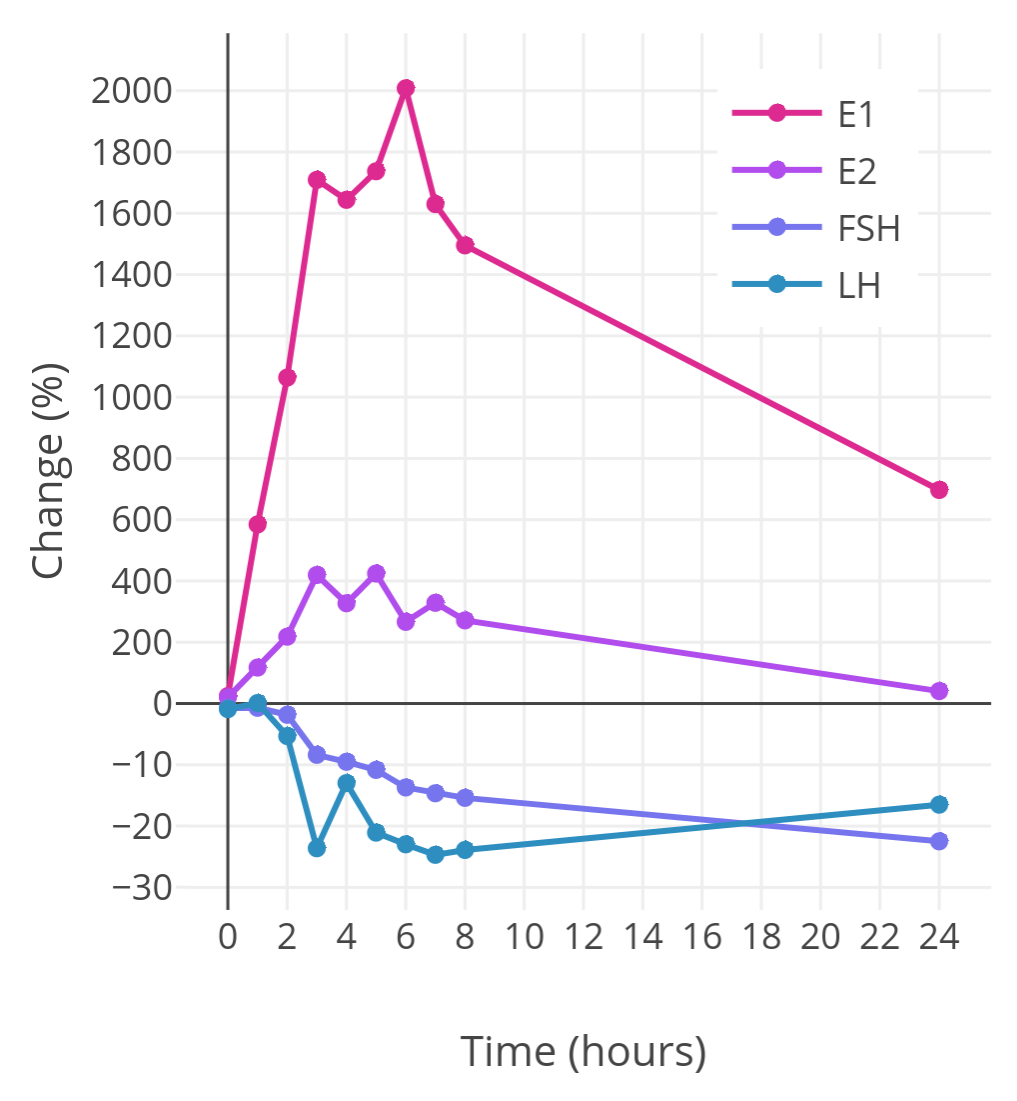
Percent change in estradiol (E2), estrone (E1), LH, and FSH levels over a 24-hour period following a single dose of 2 mg oral estradiol in women.

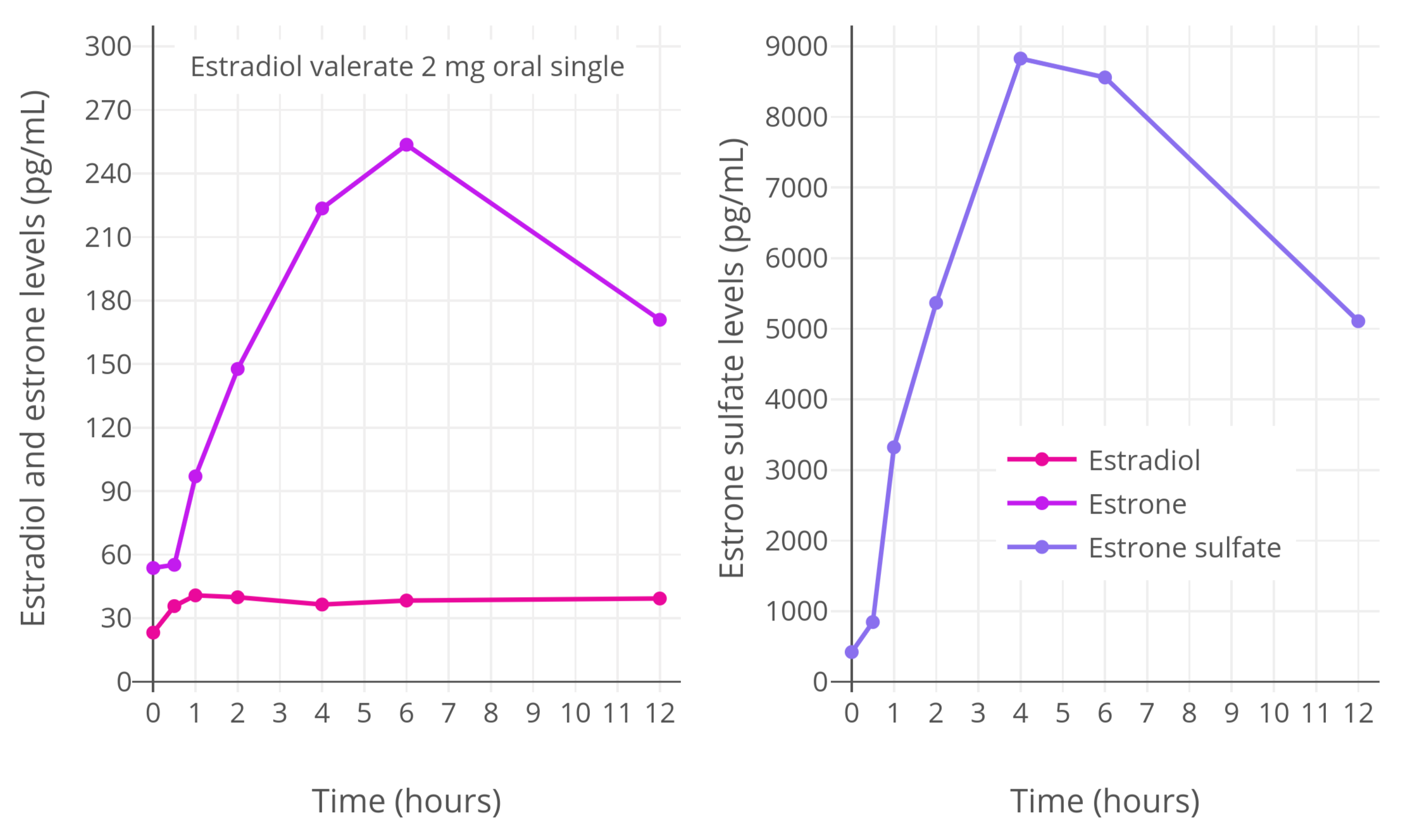
Levels of estradiol, estrone, and estrone sulfate following a single 2 mg oral dose of estradiol valerate in postmenopausal women.

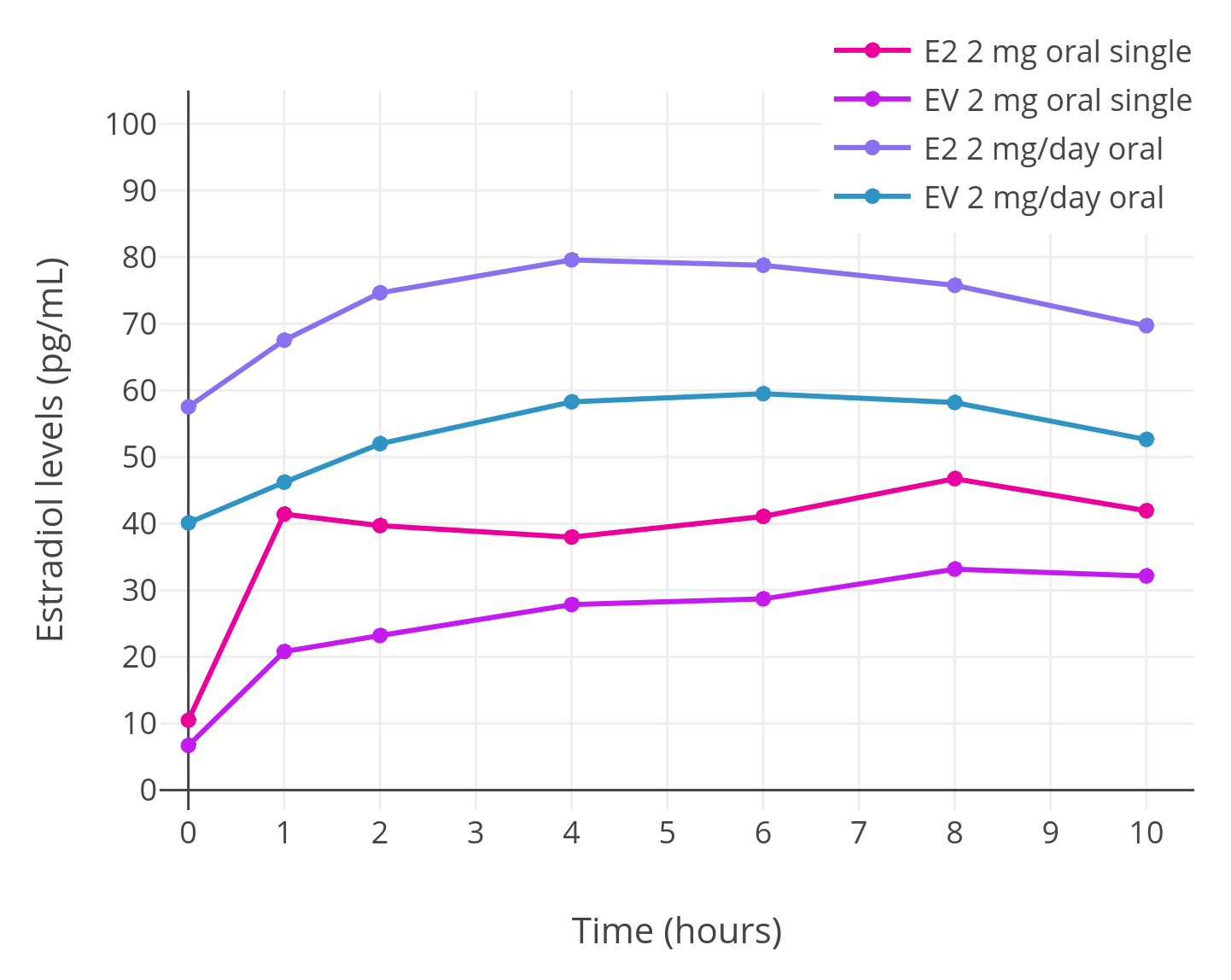
Estradiol levels after a single dose of 2 mg oral estradiol or 2 mg oral estradiol valerate and with continuous administration of 2 mg/day oral estradiol or 2 mg/day oral estradiol valerate (at steady state) in postmenopausal women.
Sources: See template page.

=== Buccal administration ===
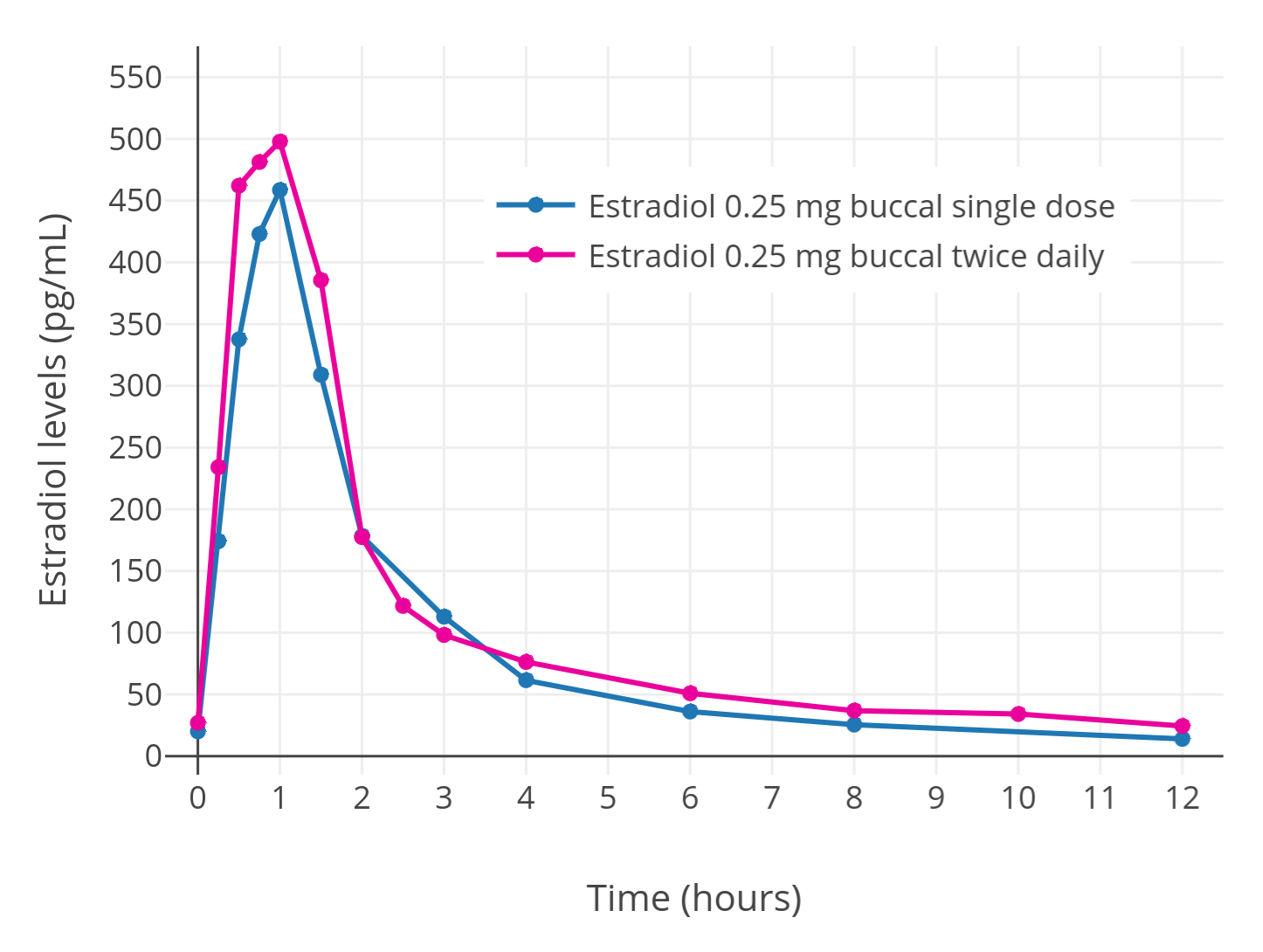
Estradiol levels on the first day after single dose of 0.25 mg buccal estradiol or at steady state after the last dose with 0.25 mg buccal estradiol twice daily once every 12 hours (0.5 mg/day total) in 6 postmenopausal women.

Estradiol has been studied for use by buccal administration. Preclinical studies of buccal estradiol have also been conducted. Buccal and sublingual administration of estradiol have similar characteristics.

Administration of a troche (lozenge) containing 0.25 mg estradiol via the buccal route resulted in peak estradiol levels of about 450 pg/mL at 1 hour post-dose in postmenopausal women. Following this, estradiol levels decreased to about 60 pg/mL at 4 hours post-dose and to about 15 pg/mL at 12 hours post-dose. With continuous twice daily administration of 0.25 mg estradiol (0.5 mg/day total) via the buccal route once every 12 hours, peak estradiol levels at steady state after the last dose were about 500 pg/mL.

=== Sublingual administration ===
Estradiol tablets can be taken sublingually instead of orally. Non-micronized estradiol tablets in doses of 0.125, 0.25, and 1 mg were previously marketed for use by sublingual administration under brand names such as Diogynets, Estradiol Membrettes, and Dimenformon in the 1950s. Non-micronized estradiol has poor water solubility, but micronized estradiol is rapidly absorbed by the sublingual route. All oral estradiol tablets are micronized, as this improves the efficiency of estradiol absorption in the gastrointestinal tract. Likewise, all oral estradiol valerate tablets seem to be micronized. The sublingual route is, in actuality, probably a combination of sublingual and oral delivery of estradiol due to incidental swallowing of some of the estradiol.

The absorption of sublingual estradiol can be attributed to the rich vascularization under the tongue. With administration of an oral estradiol tablet sublingually, complete dissolution of the tablet occurs within a few minutes and circulating levels of estradiol begin to rise within 5 minutes. Maximal levels of estradiol occur after 30 to 60 minutes of administration. After this, estradiol levels drop steeply within 4 hours, and this is followed by a more gradual decline in levels of estradiol and a return to baseline concentrations by 24 hours. The rapid rise and steep fall of estradiol levels with sublingual administration of estradiol is analogous to the case of intravenous injection and intranasal administration of the hormone.

Sublingual administration of medications that are subject to a high first-pass effect with oral administration can result in improved bioavailability because the first pass through the intestines and liver is bypassed. As a result, sublingual estradiol has been found to result in estradiol levels and a ratio of estradiol to estrone that are substantially higher than oral estradiol. Maximal circulating levels of estradiol are as much as 10-fold higher with sublingual administration than with oral administration, and the absolute bioavailability of estradiol is approximately 5-fold higher. On the other hand, levels of estradiol fall rapidly with sublingual administration, whereas they remain elevated for a prolonged period of time with oral administration. This is due to the large circulating pool of hormonally inert estrogen conjugates with long half-lives that is reversibly generated with oral estradiol during first-pass metabolism, which serves as a metabolism-resistant and long-lasting reservoir for continuous reconversion back into estradiol. It is also responsible for the differences in ratios between sublingual estradiol and oral estradiol in terms of maximal estradiol levels (10:1) achieved and absolute bioavailability (5:1). A study in marmoset monkeys found that the bioavailability of sublingual estradiol was 10% of that of estradiol administered by intramuscular injection.

After a dose of sublingual estradiol, levels of estrone start to slowly but progressively rise within 10 minutes. Estrone levels surpass estradiol levels at around 2 hours post-dose and reach a maximum at about 4 hours. It has been speculated that the high delayed levels of estrone with sublingual estradiol may be due to the rich lymphatic drainage in the neck region, which may result in estradiol being taken up by the reticuloendothelial system and then metabolized into estrone.

Sublingual administration of a single 0.25 mg tablet of micronized estradiol has been found to produce peak levels of 300 pg/mL estradiol and 60 pg/mL estrone within 1 hour. A higher dose of 1 mg estradiol was found to result in maximum levels of 450 pg/mL estradiol and 165 pg/mL estrone, which was followed by a rapid decline in estradiol levels to 85 pg/mL within 3 hours. Conversely, the decline in estrone levels was much slower and reached a level of 80 pg/mL after 18 hours. A single administration of 4 mg micronized estradiol (two 2-mg Estrace tablets) under the tongue, considered a very high dose of sublingual estradiol, has been found to result in maximal levels of estradiol of 1759 ± 704 pg/mL, with a range of 634 to 2840 pg/mL, after 1 hour in a mixed group of normotensive and hypertensive postmenopausal women. A replication of this study using the same dosage and protocols measured estradiol levels of 2227 ± 1180 pg/mL for the whole group of women but found that estradiol levels between the normotensive and hypertensive groups were significantly different at 1790 ± 869 pg/mL and 2664 ± 1490 pg/mL, respectively.

Although sublingual administration of estradiol has a relatively short duration, the medication can be administered multiple times per day in divided doses to compensate for this. Studies that used high doses of sublingual estradiol in the treatment of severe postpartum depression have administered a dose of 1 mg 3 to 8 times per day. In one study, which administered a mean total dosage of sublingual estradiol of 4.8 mg/day, estradiol levels remained elevated at about 130 pg/mL on average in the morning before the first dose of the day.

Oral micronized estradiol valerate tablets can be taken sublingually as well. The administration of 2 mg oral micronized estradiol valerate tablets (Progynova, Schering) sublingually 3 or 4 times per day resulted in circulating estradiol levels of about 290 pg/mL to 460 pg/mL in premenopausal women (time of measurements not given). Steady-state levels of estradiol were achieved within about 5 or 6 days. Levels of progesterone, luteinizing hormone, and follicle-stimulating hormone were all considerably suppressed, and ovulation, as well as the associated mid-cycle hormonal surges, were prevented. Sublingual estradiol valerate is used for cycle control in egg donation and surrogacy in cisgender women and is used in hormone therapy for transgender women.

Cyclodextrin-containing formulations of sublingual estradiol with improved water solubility and absorption have been developed and studied.

==== Clinical effects ====
The total endometrial proliferation dose of sublingual estradiol in women is 60 to 140 mg per cycle or 14 days and of sublingual estradiol benzoate in women is 60 to 180 mg per cycle or 14 days. Both sublingual estradiol and sublingual estradiol benzoate have a persistence of estrogenic effect after a dose of only one day. The effects of sublingual estradiol on gonadotropin levels have also been studied in postmenopausal women. After a dose of sublingual estradiol, levels of luteinizing hormone (LH) and follicle-stimulating hormone (FSH) decrease precipitously within 4 hours. Following this, LH and FSH levels gradually increase, and return to near-baseline levels by 24 hours. One study found no difference between oral and sublingual estradiol in suppression of LH levels. However, FSH levels were suppressed to a greater extent with sublingual estradiol than with oral estradiol in the study.

It is notable that the magnitude of the genomic effects of estradiol (i.e., signaling through the nuclear ERs) may, at least in some cases, be dependent on the total estrogenic exposure as opposed to the duration of exposure. For instance, in normal human epithelial breast cells and ER-positive breast cancer cells, the rate of breast cell proliferation has been found not to differ with estradiol incubation of 1 nM for 24 hours and incubation of 24 nM for 1 hour. In other words, short-term high concentrations and long-term low concentrations of estradiol appear to have the same degree of effect in terms of genomic estrogenic signaling, at least in terms of breast cell proliferation over a 24-hour period. On the other hand, non-genomic actions of estradiol, such as signaling through membrane estrogen receptors like the GPER, may be reduced with short-term high concentrations of estradiol relative to more sustained levels. For instance, although daily intranasal administration of estradiol is associated with comparable clinical effectiveness (e.g., for hot flashes) relative to longer acting routes of estradiol administration in postmenopausal women, it is also associated with significantly lower rates of breast tension (tenderness and enlargement) relative to longer acting estradiol routes, and this is thought to reflect comparatively diminished non-genomic signaling.

==== Graphs ====
Hormone levels with sublingual estradiol
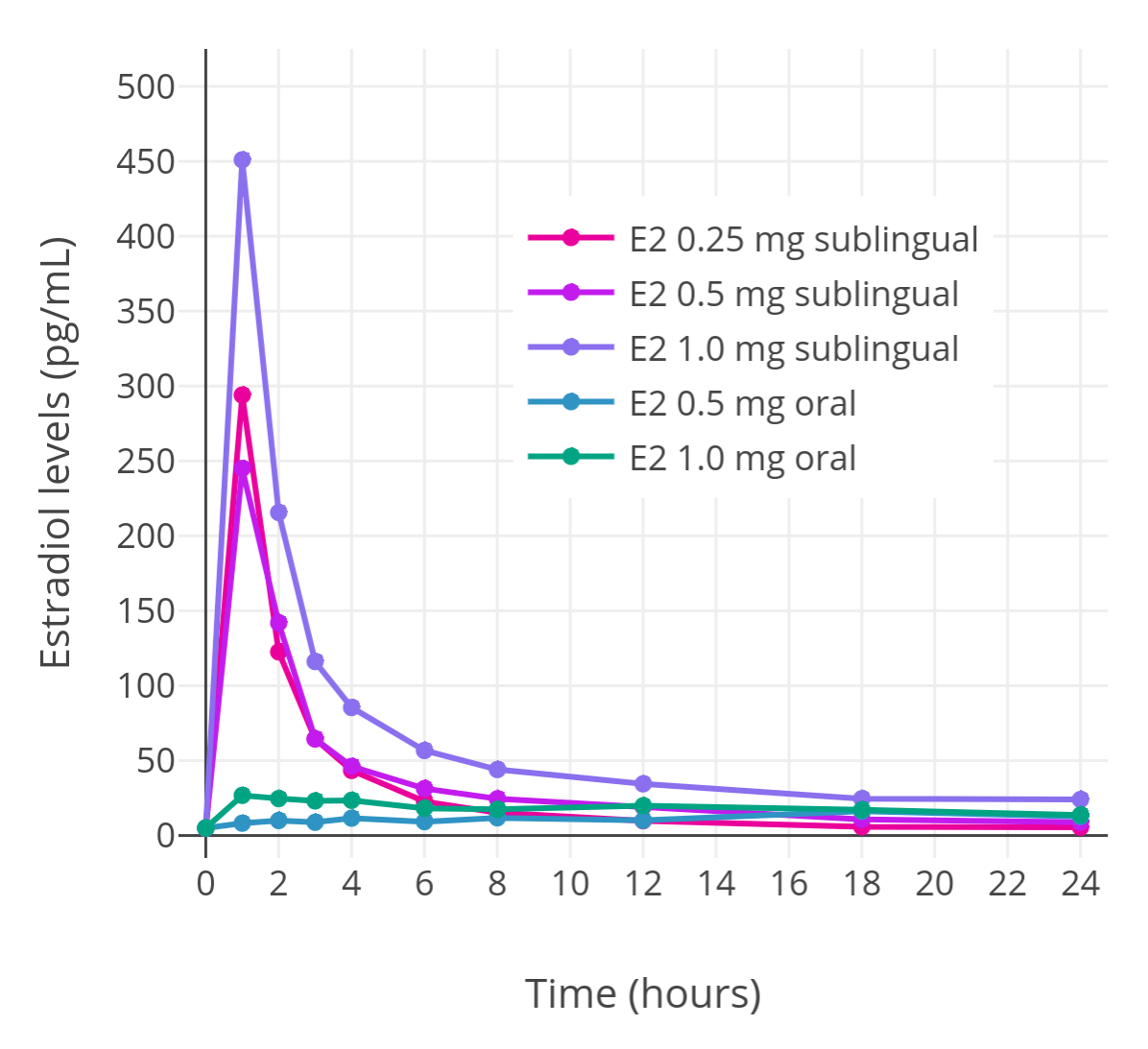
Estradiol levels over a 24-hour period following a single 0.25, 0.5, or 1 mg dose of sublingual estradiol or a single 0.5 or 1 mg dose of oral estradiol in postmenopausal women. Source: Price et al. (1997).

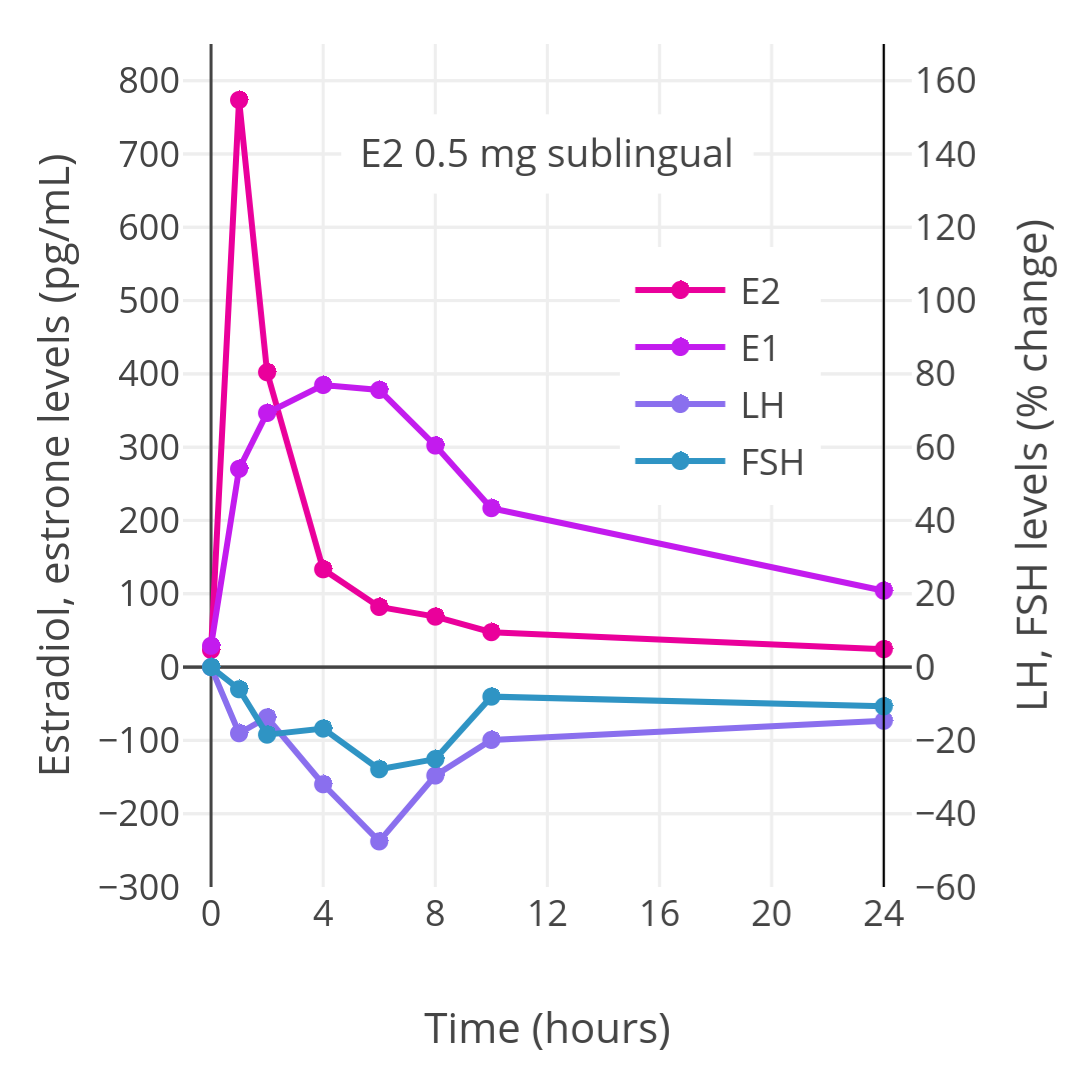
Hormone levels after a single 0.5 mg dose of sublingual estradiol in postmenopausal women. Source: Burnier et al. (1981).

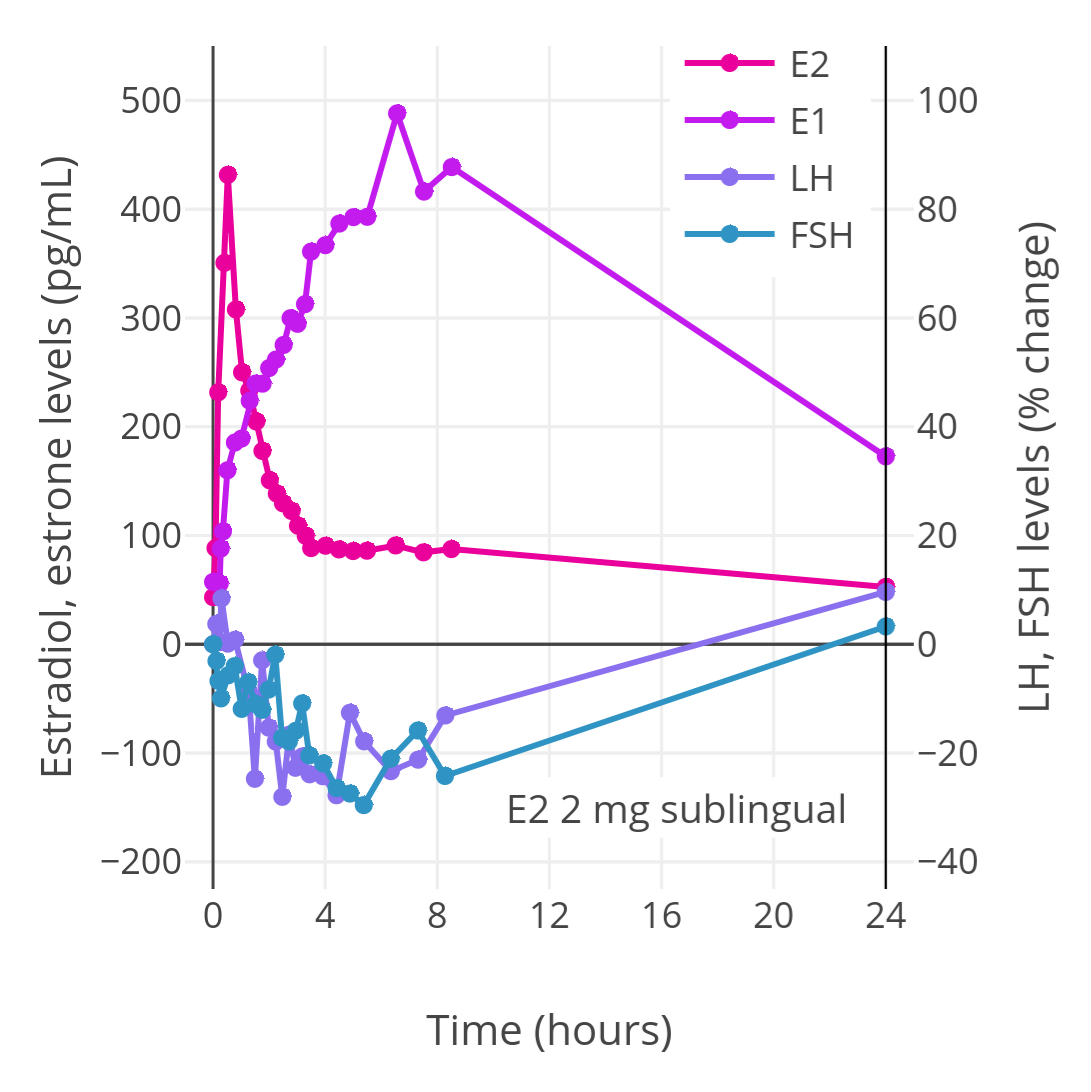
Hormone levels after a single 2 mg dose of sublingual estradiol in premenopausal women. Source: Casper & Yen (1981).

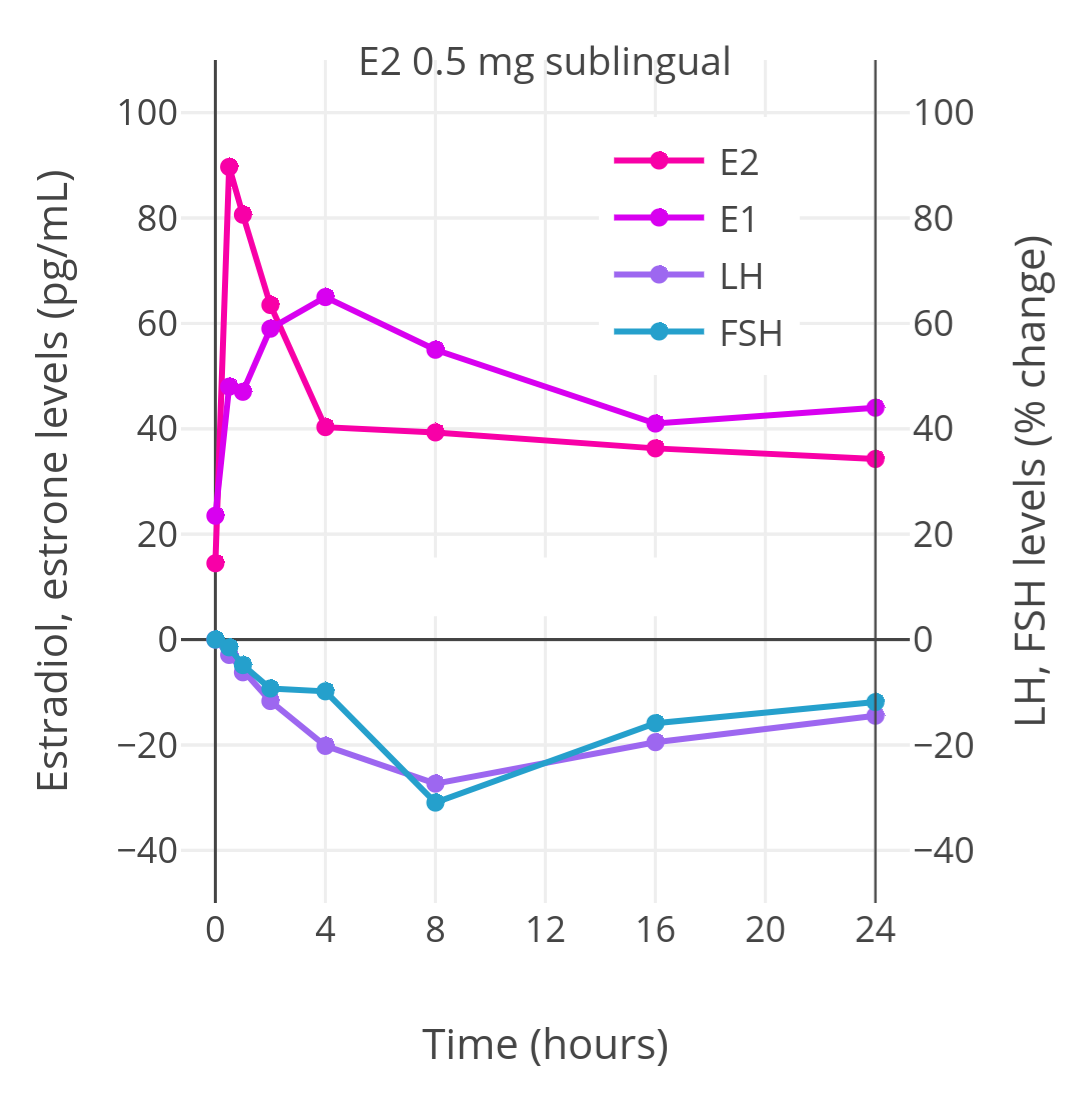
Hormone levels after a single 0.5 mg dose of sublingual estradiol in postmenopausal women. Source: Fiet et al. (1982).

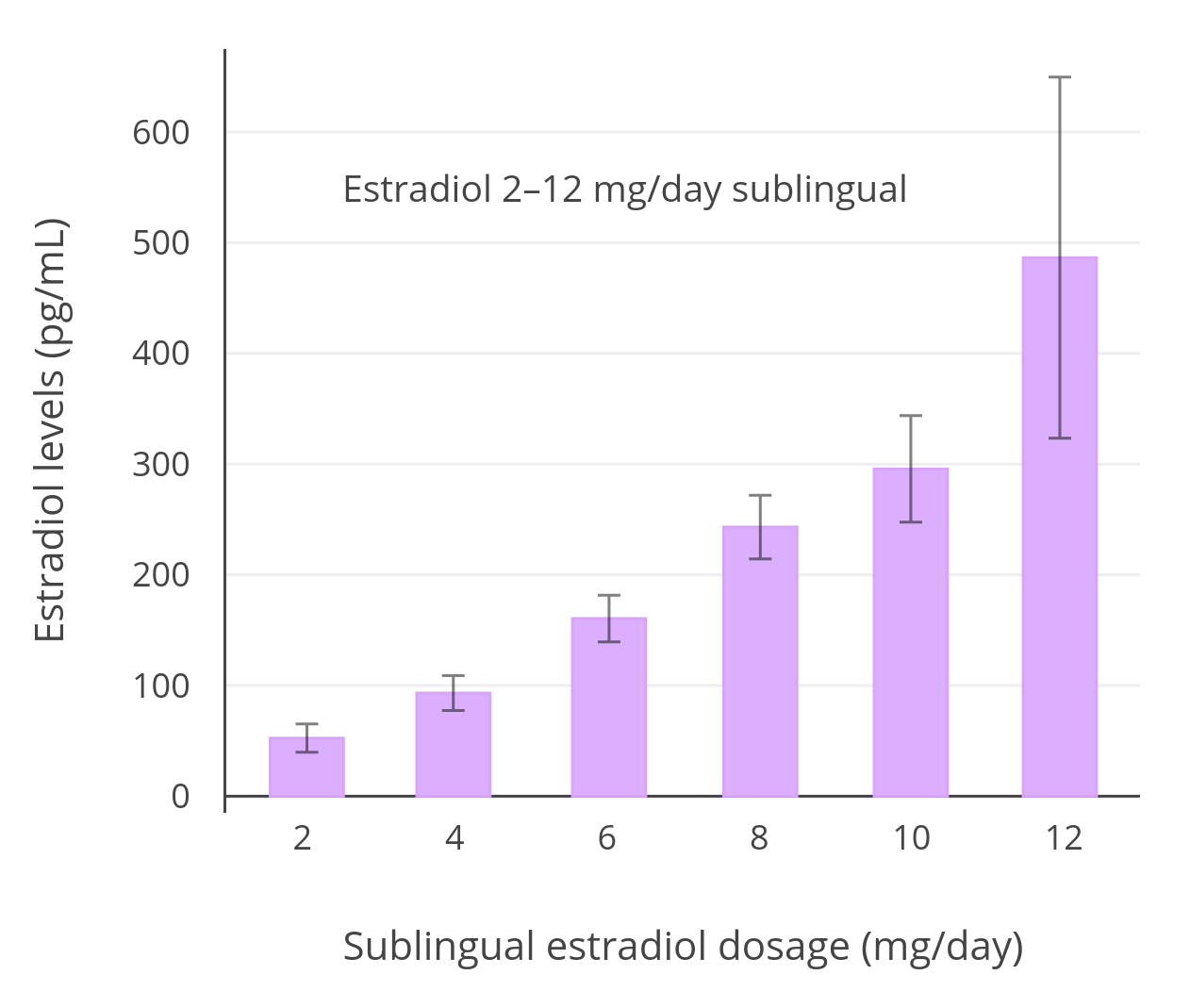
Estradiol levels with 2 to 12 mg/day sublingual estradiol taken along with spironolactone in transgender women. Error bars are SEM. Time of blood collection and time and frequency of administration were not specified. Source: Jain et al. (2019).

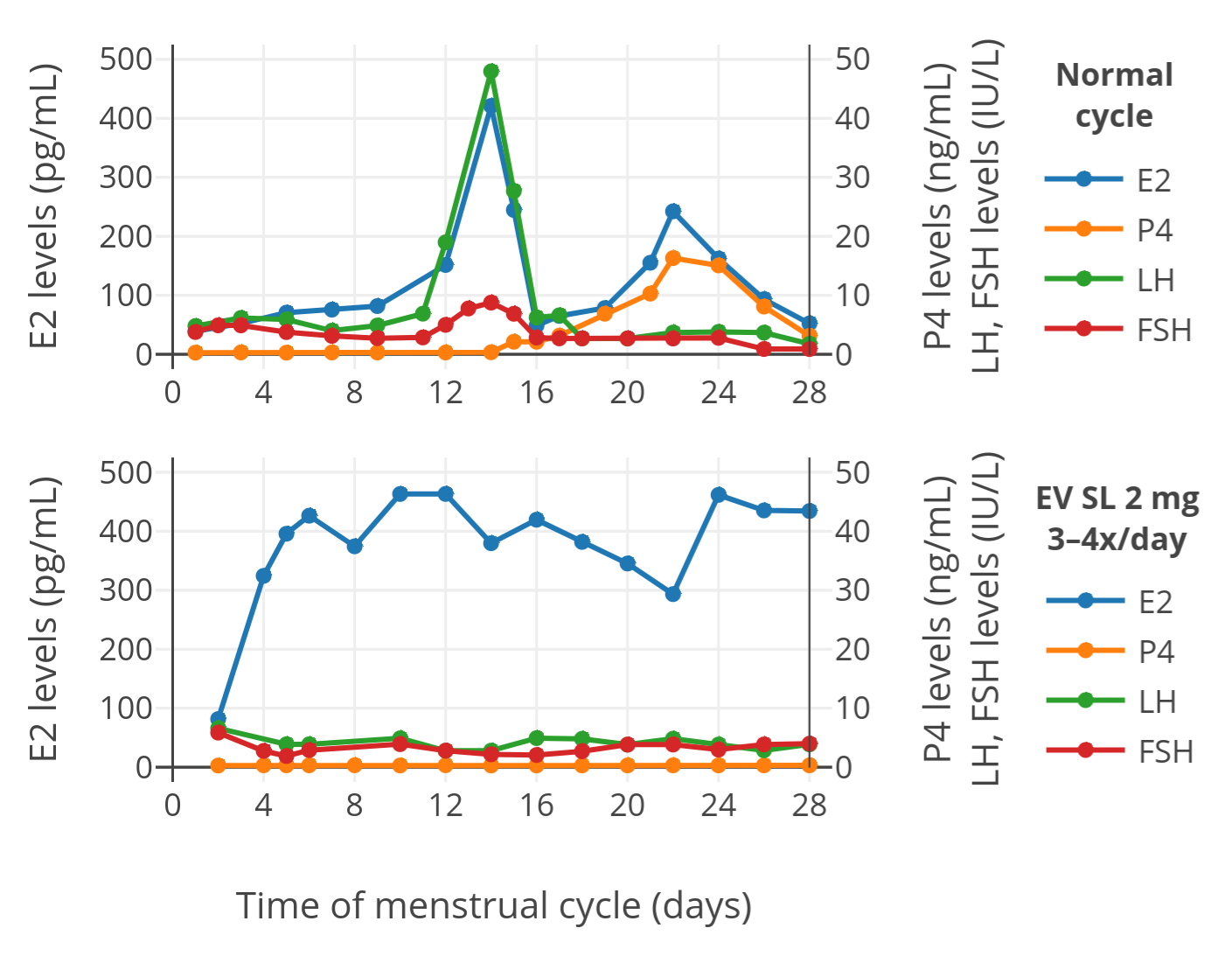
Hormone levels with 2 mg oral micronized estradiol valerate tablets (Progynova, Schering) taken 3 or 4 times per day (6–8 mg/day total) sublingually (SL) in premenopausal women. Time of blood collection after medication administration was not specified. Sources: Serhal et al. (1989, 1990).

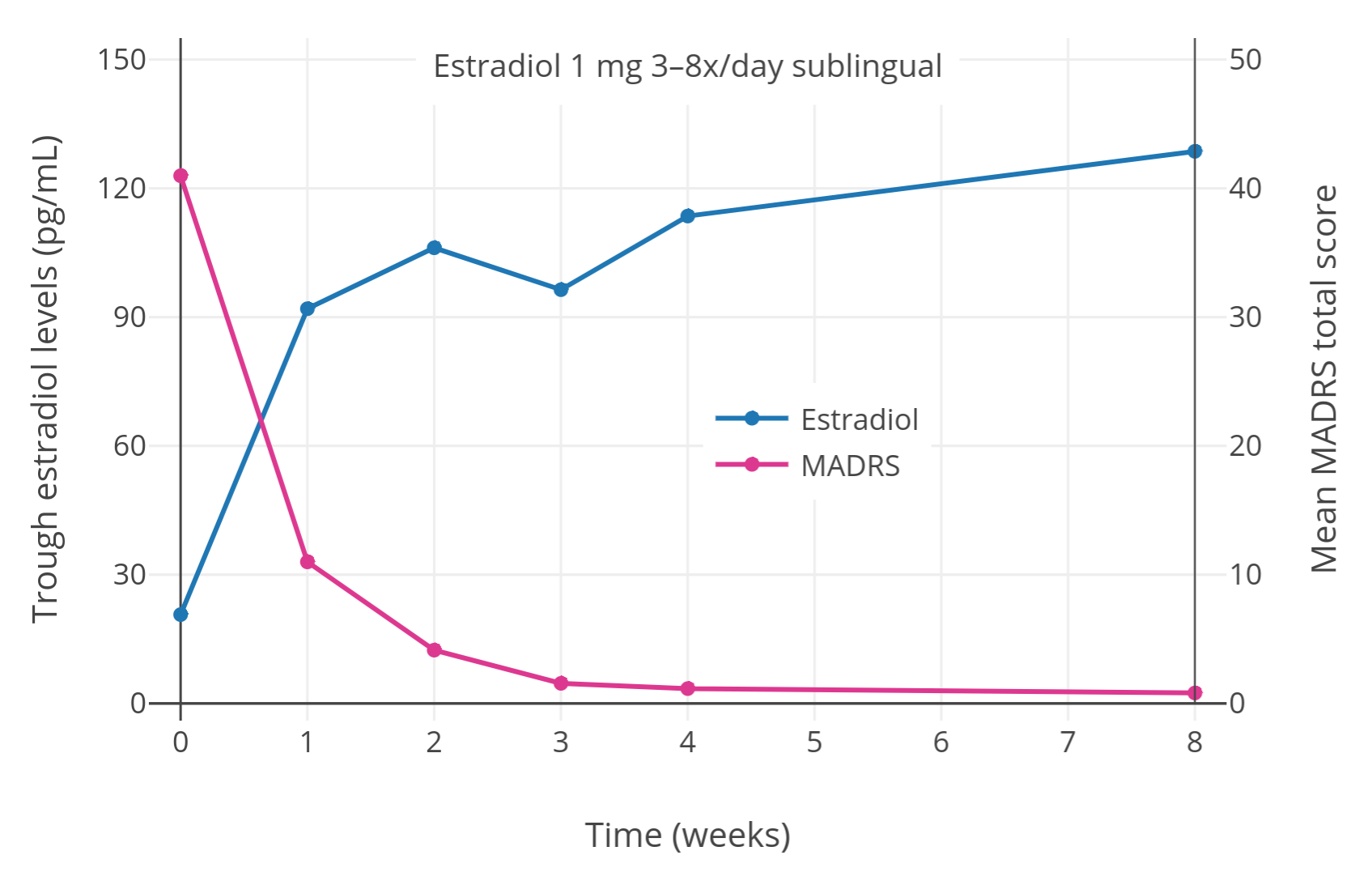
Trough estradiol levels and MADRS scores with 1 mg sublingual micronized estradiol 3 to 8 times per day (3 to 8 mg/day total; mean 4.8 mg/day total) in women with postpartum depression. Blood was drawn specifically in the mornings before the first dose of sublingual estradiol for the day. Source: Akohas et al. (2001).
Sources: See template page.

=== Intranasal administration ===
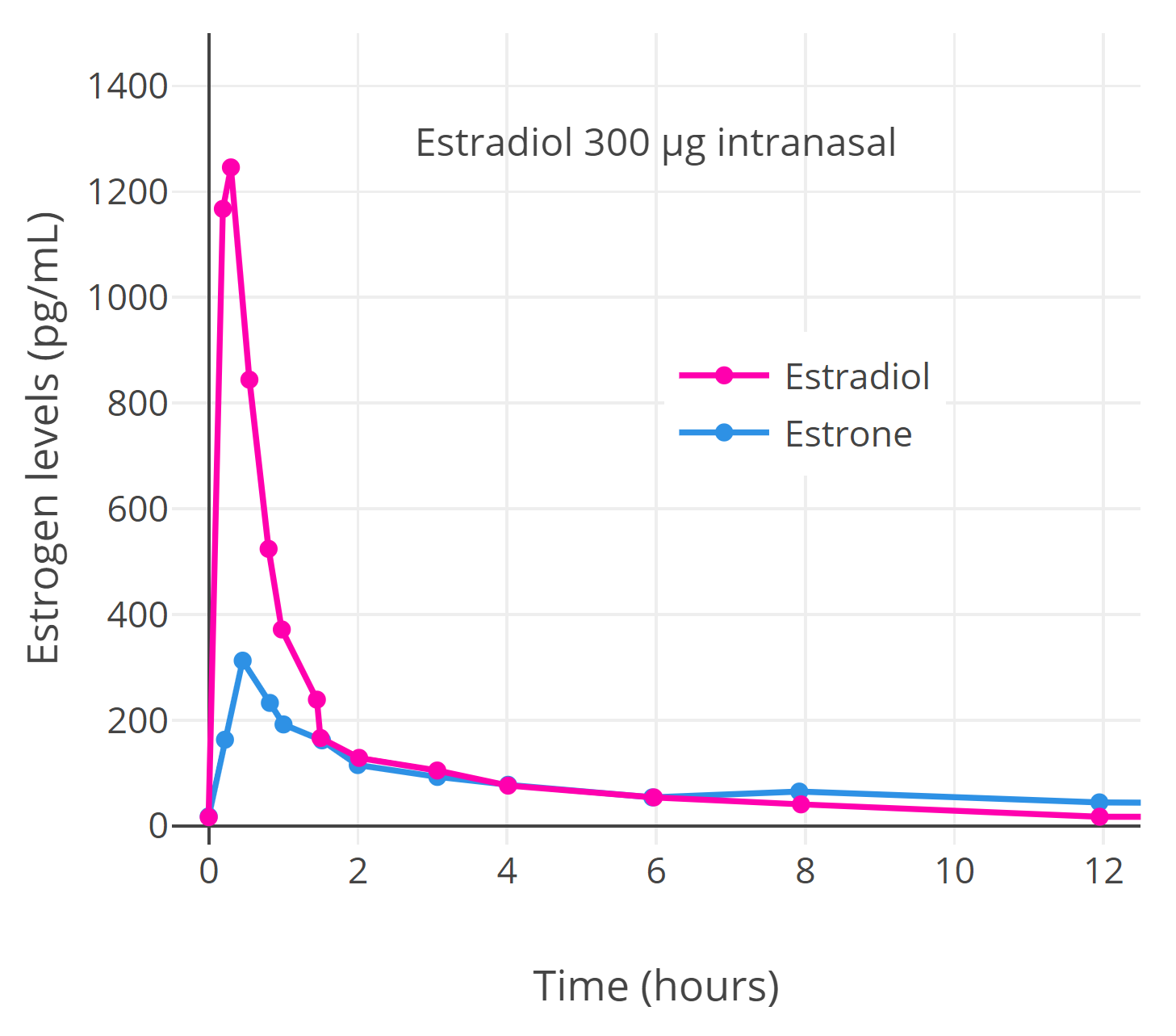
Estrogen levels after a single 300 μg dose of estradiol delivered by a cyclodextrin-containing nasal spray (brand name Aerodiol) in postmenopausal women.

Estradiol has been studied and used by intranasal administration. It was available as a cyclodextrin-containing nasal spray under the brand name Aerodiol in some countries, although this specific product was discontinued in 2007. The product was administered once per day as one 150-μg spray in each nostril (300 μg/day total). Intranasal estradiol has pharmacokinetics similar to those of sublingual and intravenous administration of estradiol, including a sharp peak and then rapid decline in estradiol levels. Despite the relatively short duration of intranasal estradiol, it has similar effectiveness to other, longer-lasting routes of administration in terms of relief of menopausal symptoms like hot flashes.

=== Transdermal administration ===
Transdermal estradiol is available in the forms of patches, gels, emulsions, and sprays. In the case of gels, emulsions, and sprays, the route is sometimes referred to as topical rather than as transdermal. Topical administration can also refer to vaginal administration of gels and creams however.

Estradiol has moderate skin permeability, which is based on the lipophilicity and hydrophilicity of a compound. In general, the more polar groups, such as hydroxyl groups, that are present in a steroid, and hence the more hydrophilic and less lipophilic it is, the lower its skin permeability. For this reason, estrone and progesterone have higher skin permeability, while estriol and cortisol have lower skin permeability. The transdermal bioavailability of estradiol in an alcohol solution is approximately 10%. Transdermal estradiol reservoir patches have been reported to have a bioavailability of 3 to 5%. Estradiol is a highly potent compound and circulates at picomolar concentrations (pg/mL), which makes it ideal for transdermal application as only small amounts of substance need to be delivered across the skin. Conversely, progesterone, which circulates at levels in the nanomolar range and requires a far higher quantity of substance for biological effect, is not well-suited for transdermal delivery. Fatty acid esters of estradiol, such as estradiol benzoate, estradiol valerate, and estradiol cypionate, have been found to have similar estrogenic potency to estradiol but a comparatively longer duration with transdermal administration in animal studies.

Regardless of administration form, such as patch or gel, transdermal estradiol is transported into the skin, including through the stratum corneum, epidermis, and dermis, by a passive diffusion process. Following this, estradiol is then taken up by local capillary blood vessels and delivered into the circulation. There is a depot effect in the skin with transdermal estradiol, which results in continuous delivery of transdermal estradiol into the circulation. This is because the skin functions as a semipermeable membrane and there is a concentration gradient between the application site of transdermal estradiol and capillary blood, with the rate of diffusion of estradiol across the stratum corneum being the specific rate-limiting factor in absorption. As a result, peaks and troughs in circulating estradiol levels are limited, and the skin and subcutaneous fat act as a reservoir of estradiol that maintains circulating estradiol levels between doses. For these reasons, transdermal estradiol can provide near-constant circulating levels of estradiol, similarly to oral estradiol. Enzymes that metabolize estradiol are minimally expressed in the skin, and for this reason, the metabolism of estradiol in the skin is low.

The site of application of transdermal estradiol can influence its bioavailability. A study found comparable absorption of transdermal estradiol patches (within ±25% of reference) for a number of skin sites including the abdomen, upper arm, upper thigh, lower back, and side. However, absorption was 15% lower for the upper thigh compared to the abdomen and the difference was significant. Another study found that transdermal estradiol patches had 20 to 25% higher bioavailability when applied to the buttocks than when applied to the abdomen. Studies of topical steroids have found that the scrotum is especially permeable among skin sites. Studies of transdermal testosterone cream, gel, and patches applied to the scrotum in men have observed 5- to 8-fold higher levels of testosterone than with application to conventional skin sites. In a study of topical application of hydrocortisone solution in men, skin permeability (defined as total radiolabeled urinary excretion) relative to the forearm (1.0) was 42.0 for the scrotum, 13.0 for the jaw angle, 6.0 for the forehead, 3.6 for the underarm, 3.5 for the scalp, 1.7 for the back, 0.8 for the palm of the hand, 0.4 for the ankle, and 0.1 for the sole of the foot. In accordance with findings with other topical steroids, a study in men with prostate cancer treated with transdermal estradiol patches applied to the scrotum observed about 5-fold higher estradiol levels relative to application to conventional skin sites such as the forearm. Penile skin may have similarly enhanced absorption characteristics relative to scrotal skin.

Transdermal estradiol bypasses the intestines and liver and hence the first-pass metabolism that is associated with oral administration. In addition, unlike oral estradiol, transdermal estradiol is not associated with supraphysiological concentrations of estrone or estrogen conjugates like estradiol sulfate, and transdermal estradiol does not have disproportionate effects on liver protein synthesis. In accordance, estradiol, at typical menopausal replacement dosages, has been found not to increase the risk of blood clots or insulin resistance, nor to affect hepatic SHBG, IGF-1, GHBP, IGFBP, and other protein production and by extension circulating hepatic protein levels. However, at higher doses, transdermal estradiol has been associated with a significantly higher incidence of stroke in postmenopausal women, probably due to blood clots. Another larger study did not find a significantly higher risk of blood clots with similar doses of transdermal estradiol however.

==== Transdermal patches ====
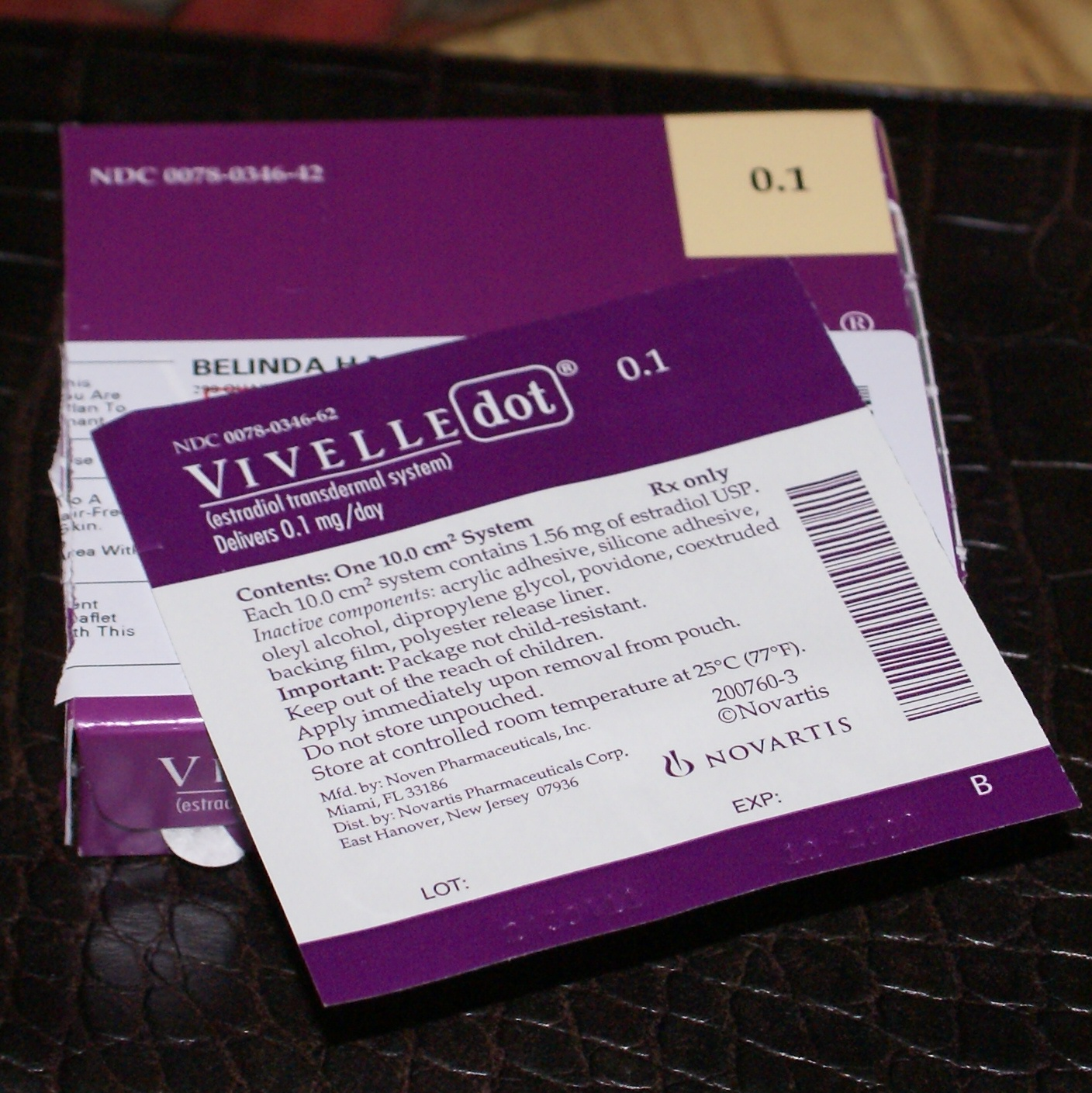
Vivelle-Dot, an estradiol patch.

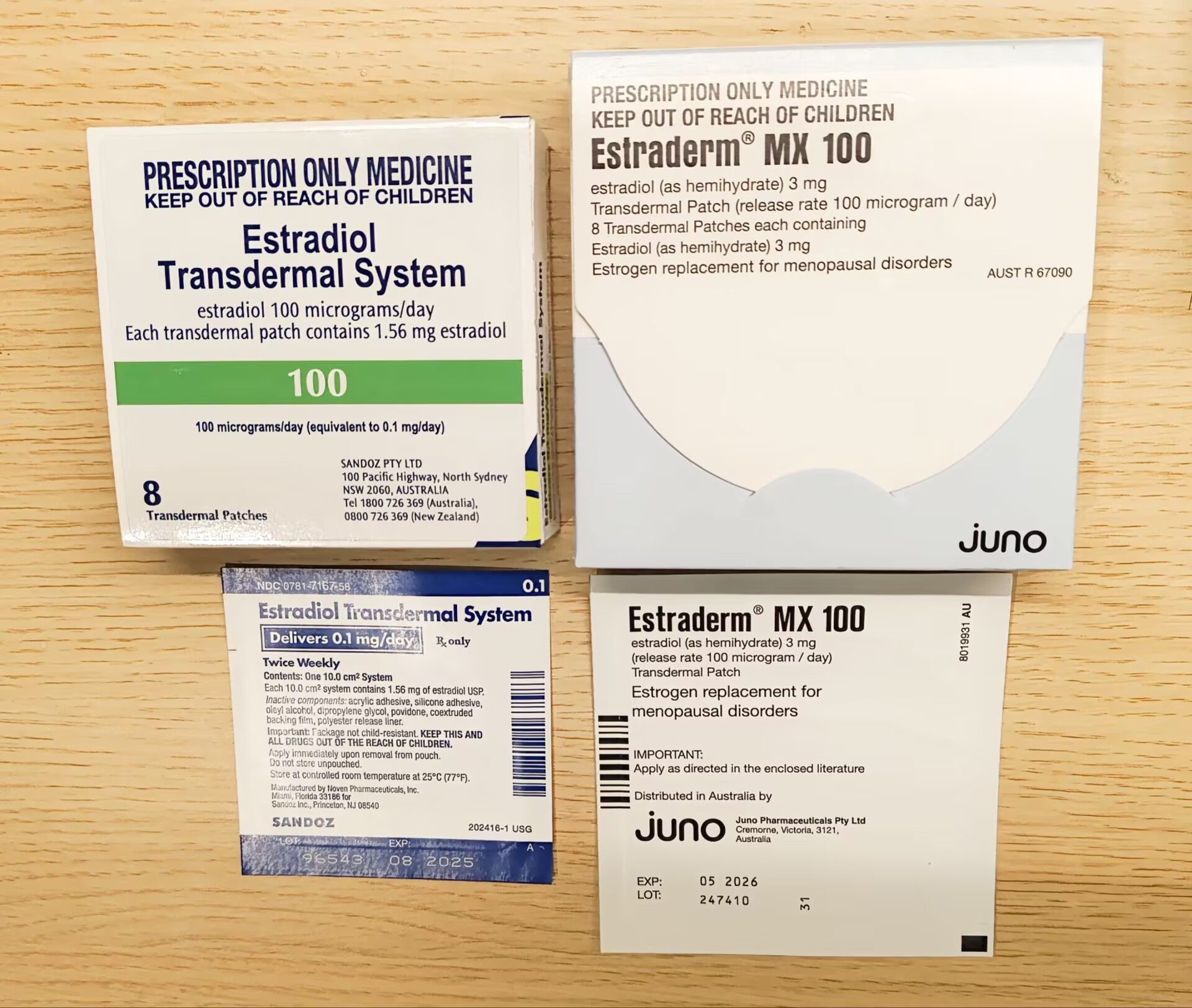
Two boxes of estradiol patches with different brands sold in Australia.

Estradiol patches have an extended duration and are available for twice-weekly (3–4-day) and once-weekly (7-day) application, while gels, emulsions, and sprays are administered daily. There are two types of estradiol patches: reservoir patches, which have been described as first-generation patches, and matrix patches, which are considered to be improved second-generation patches. Reservoir patches were designed for twice-weekly application, while matrix patches have been produced for both twice-weekly and once-weekly application. Reservoir patches of estradiol (e.g., Estraderm TTS) are mostly no longer used, with most estradiol patches available today being matrix patches (e.g., Alora, Climara, Esclim, Estradot, FemPatch, Menostar, Oesclim, Vivelle, Vivelle-Dot, and Estraderm MX).

Available transdermal estradiol patches in the United States (Note: Specific links for each patch's FDA approval and label are not given.)
Brand name	Dose (µg/day)	DOA (d)	Size (Note: For comparison, a United States quarter is about 4.6 cm^{2} (0.72 in^{2}).) (Note: Sizes are respective to the dosages in the dose column.) (cm^{2})	Levels (pg/mL)	Intro.
Alora	25, 50, 75, 100	3–4	9, 18, 27, 36	43–144	1996
Climara (Note: Generic version available.)	25, 37.5, 50, 60, 75, 100	7	6.5, 9.375, 12.5, 15, 18.75, 25	17–174	1994
Climara Pro (Note: Combined with a progestin.)	E2 (45); LNG (15)	7	22	27–54	2003
CombiPatch	E2 (50); NETA (14, 25)	3–4	9, 16	27–71	1998
Menostar	14	7	3.25	13–21	2004
Minivelle	25, 37.5, 50, 75, 100	3–4	1.65, 2.48, 3.3, 4.95, 6.6	30–117	2012
Vivelle	50, 100	3–4	14.5, 29	30–145	2000
Vivelle-Dot	25, 37.5, 50, 75, 100	3–4	2.5, 3.75, 5, 7.5, 10	30–145	1996

A dosage of 1 mg/day oral estradiol is considered to be roughly equivalent to 25 or 50 μg/day transdermal estradiol and a dosage of 2 mg/day oral estradiol is considered to be equivalent to 50 or 100 μg/day transdermal estradiol depending on the source. Estradiol patches delivering a daily dosage of 0.05 mg (50 μg) achieve mean estradiol and estrone levels of 30 to 65 pg/mL and 40 to 45 pg/mL, respectively, while a daily dosage of 0.1 mg (100 μg) attains respective mean levels of 50 to 90 pg/mL and 30 to 65 pg/mL of estradiol and estrone. In general, Climara-type estradiol transdermal patches have an approximate 1:1 ratio of estradiol delivered in μg/day relative to circulating estradiol concentration in pg/mL. In other words, a 100 μg/day Climara estradiol patch may be expected to produce circulating estradiol levels of around 100 pg/mL. Transdermal estradiol patches produce an estradiol to estrone ratio of about 1:1. Following removal of an estradiol patch, circulating estradiol levels decrease to baseline within 24 hours.

Typical dosages of estradiol patches are intended to provide the minimum amount of estrogen replacement necessary for the effective alleviation of menopausal symptoms, and for this reason, they achieve relatively low levels of estradiol. A dosage of two to six 100 μg/day transdermal estradiol patches can achieve mean levels of estradiol in the area of 200 to 400 pg/mL and can be used as a form of high-dose estrogen therapy, for instance to suppress testosterone levels in the treatment of prostate cancer in men and in feminizing hormone therapy for transgender women. High-dose transdermal estradiol patches have also been studied in the treatment of postpartum depression and postpartum psychosis; in one such study, 200, 400, and 800 μg/day estradiol in the form of transdermal patches resulted in estradiol levels of 286 pg/mL, 675 pg/mL, and 1032 pg/mL, respectively. In another study, estradiol levels with 800 μg/day estradiol in the form of transdermal patches (Estraderm TTS) resulted in estradiol levels of 690 to 815 pg/mL. However, there is erratic absorption and considerable variation in estradiol levels using high-dose estradiol patches both between and within individuals, with one study finding that estradiol levels ranged from 70 pg/mL to 1,045 pg/mL (mean 460.7 pg/mL) with six 100 μg/day estradiol patches.

The Prostate Adenocarcinoma: TransCutaneous Hormones (PATCH) study is a randomized controlled trial of high-dose transdermal estradiol patches versus gonadotropin-releasing hormone agonist monotherapy in the treatment of prostate cancer in approximately 2,200 men. It is specifically comparing three to four 100 μg/day estradiol patches (FemSeven) against goserelin implants. The study was started in March 2006 and is estimated for completion in August 2021. Its objectives include comparison of survival, cardiovascular mortality and morbidity, pharmacological activity (e.g., suppression of testosterone levels), other side effects and toxicities, and quality of life. In addition to the PATCH trial, the Systemic Therapy in Advancing or Metastatic Prostate Cancer: Evaluation of Drug Efficacy (STAMPEDE) study added a high-dose estradiol patches arm (~2,000 men) in July 2017.

Estradiol patches are associated with local skin reactions and such as irritation in 14.2% of individuals (with reservoir patches), mild-to-moderate erythema (redness) in 50 to 60% of individuals, and allergic reactions due to cutaneous sensitization. Up to 5% of people using reservoir patches may discontinue therapy due to skin reactions. Visible adhesive residues are also often left by estradiol patches following their removal. Transdermal estradiol gel can serve as an alternative to transdermal estradiol patches for individuals who experience intolerable skin reactions with them. Estradiol patches should not be applied to the breast as this may result in high local levels of estradiol in the breasts and hence an increased likelihood of breast tenderness.

Hormone levels with transdermal estradiol patches
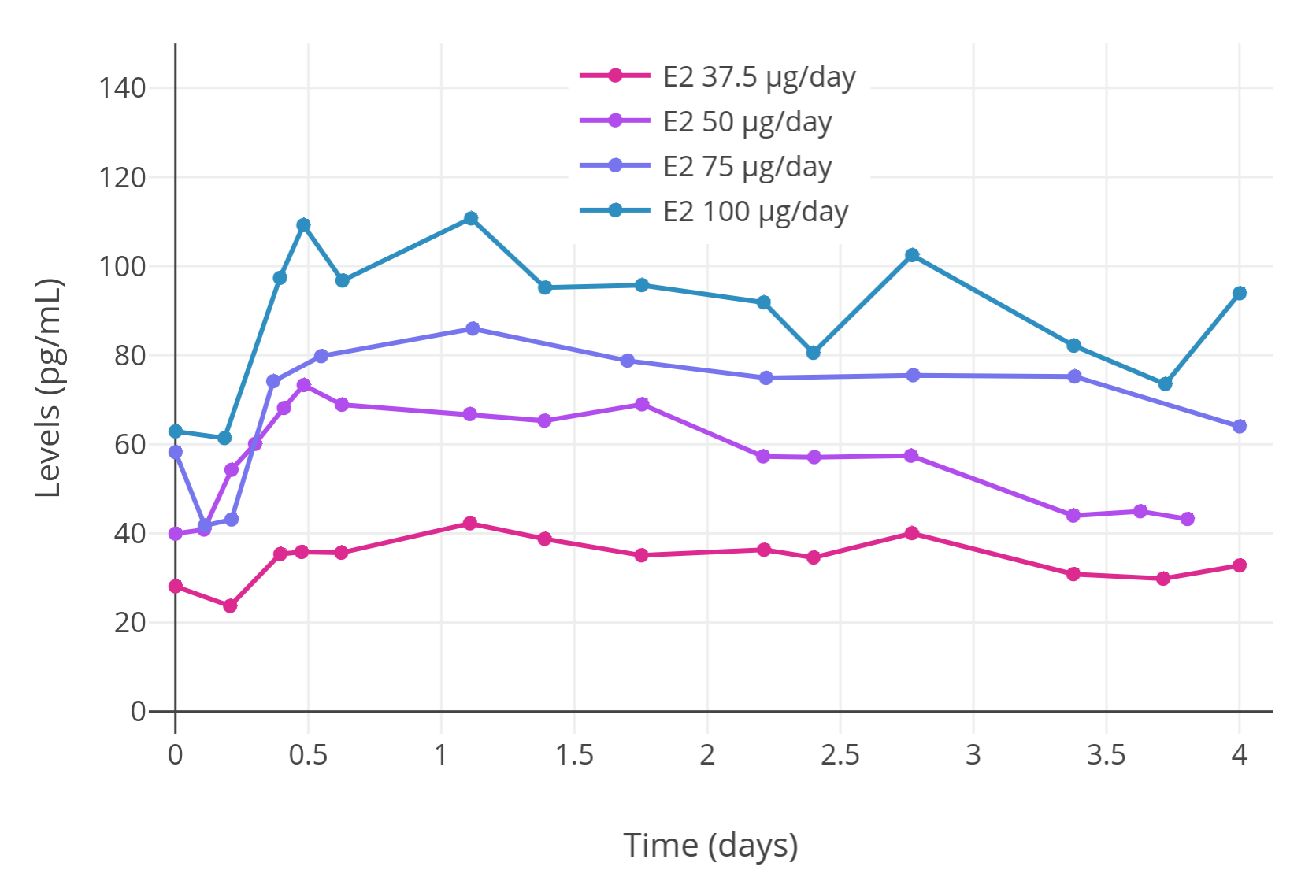
Levels of estradiol at steady-state over a period of 4 days with different dosages of Vivelle-type (Vivelle, Vivelle-Dot, Mylan generic) twice-weekly transdermal estradiol matrix patches applied to the abdomen and worn until day 4 in postmenopausal women.

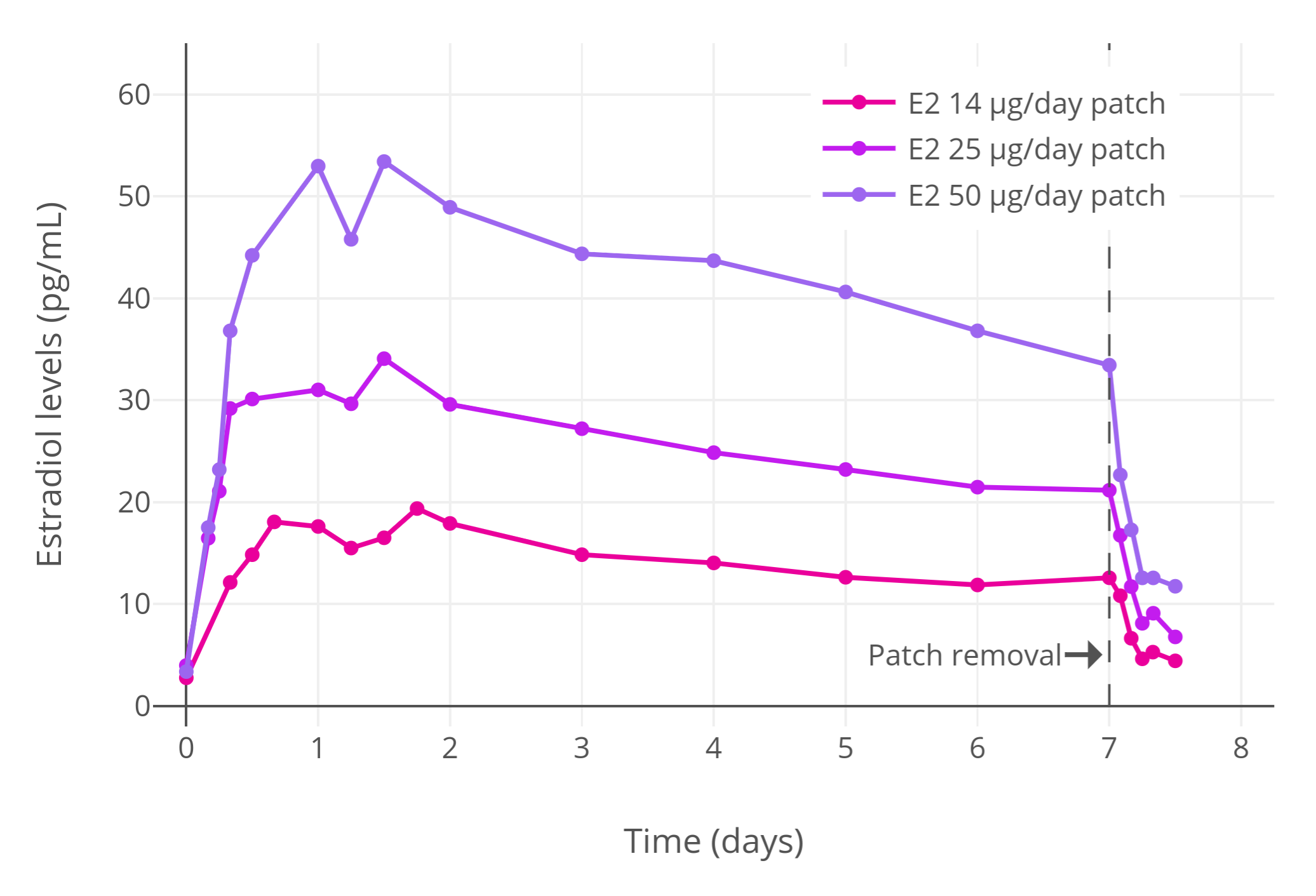
Levels of estradiol over a period of 7.5 days after a single application of different dosages of a Climara-type (Climara, Menostar, Mylan generic) once-weekly transdermal estradiol matrix patch to the abdomen and removed on day 7 in postmenopausal women.

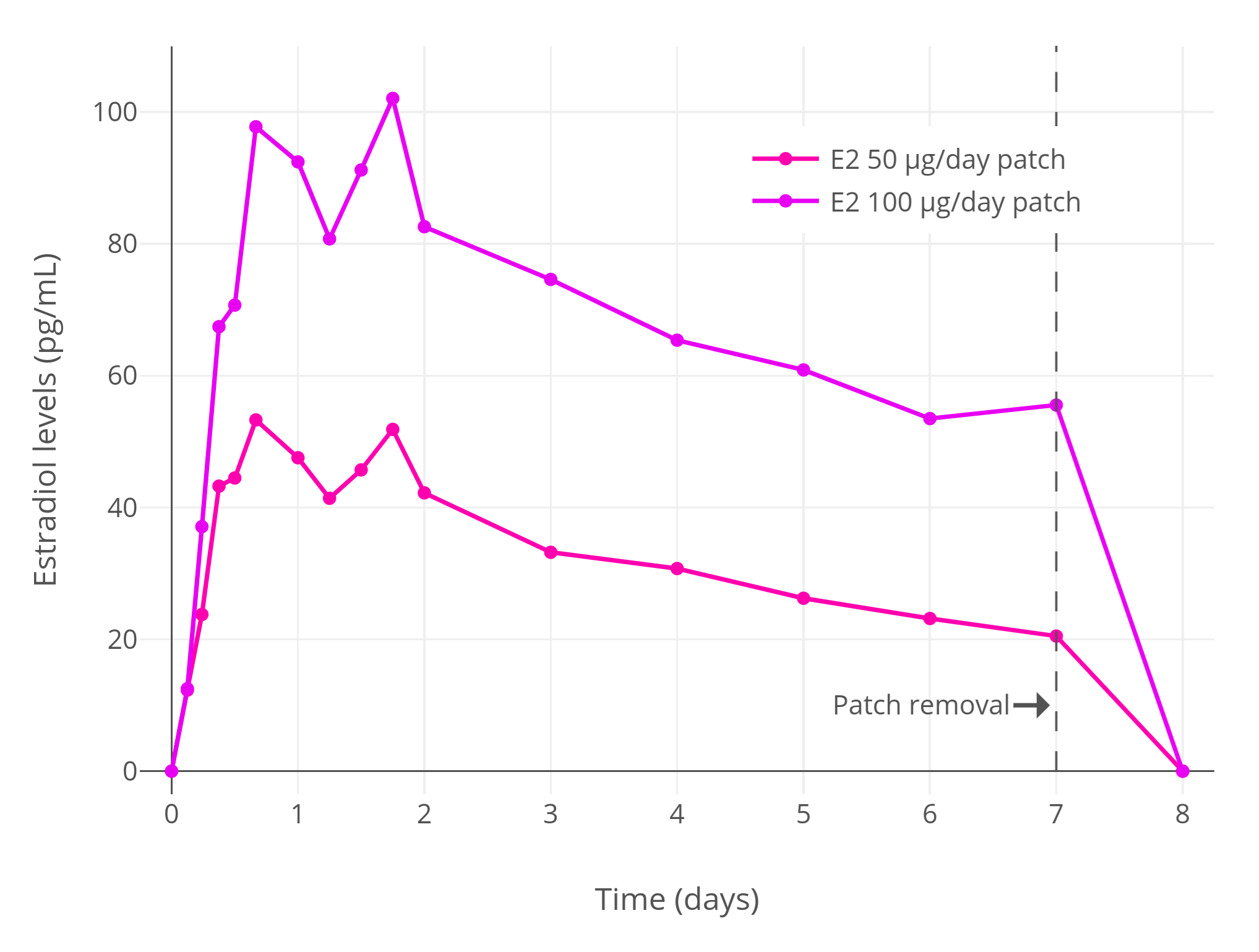
Levels of estradiol over a period of 8 days after a single application of a 50 or 100 μg/day Climara-type (Climara, Menostar, Mylan generic) once-weekly transdermal estradiol matrix patch to the abdomen and removed on day 7 in postmenopausal women.

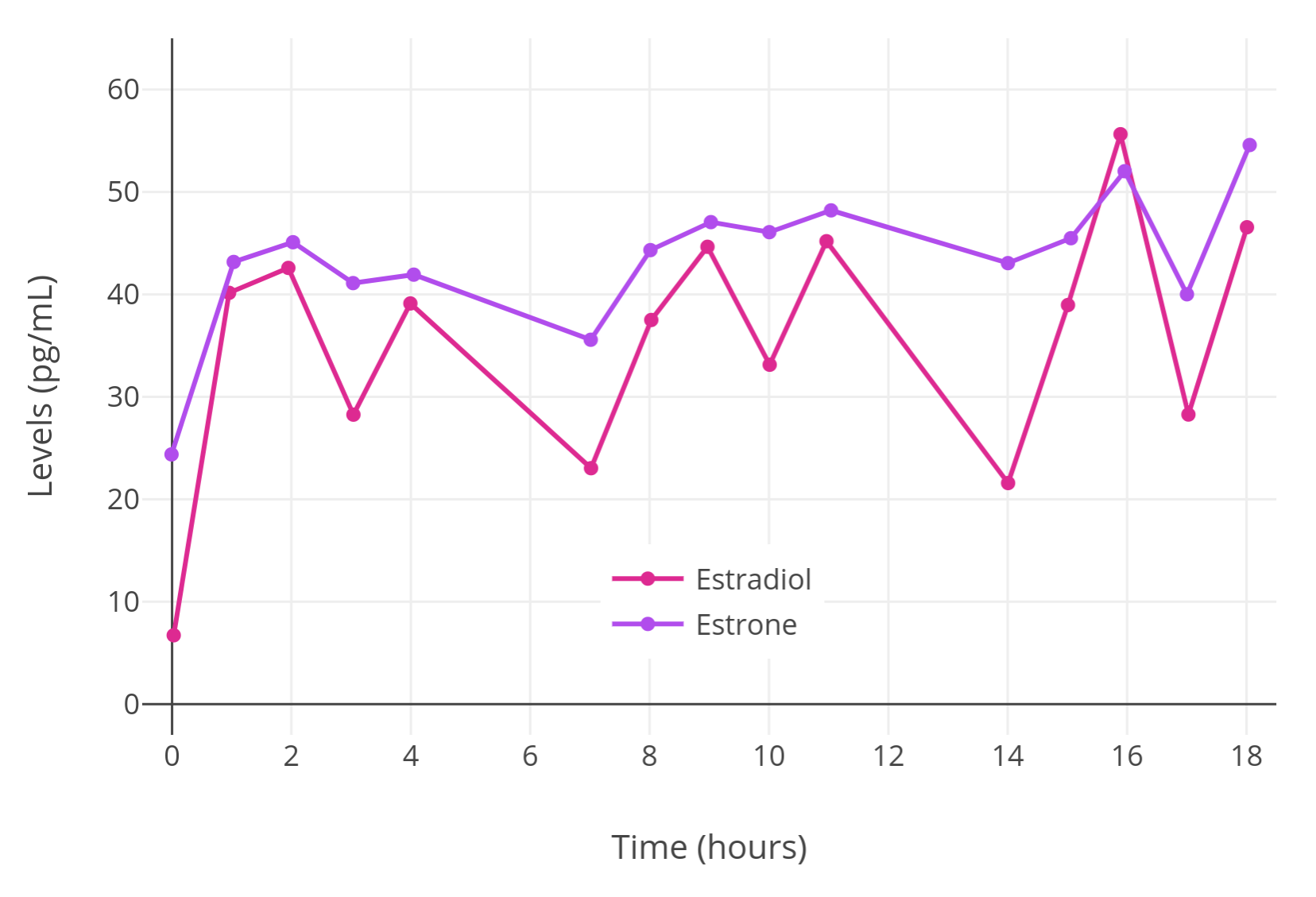
Levels of estradiol and estrone with application of a single 50 µg/day estradiol transdermal reservoir patch (Estraderm) in postmenopausal women.

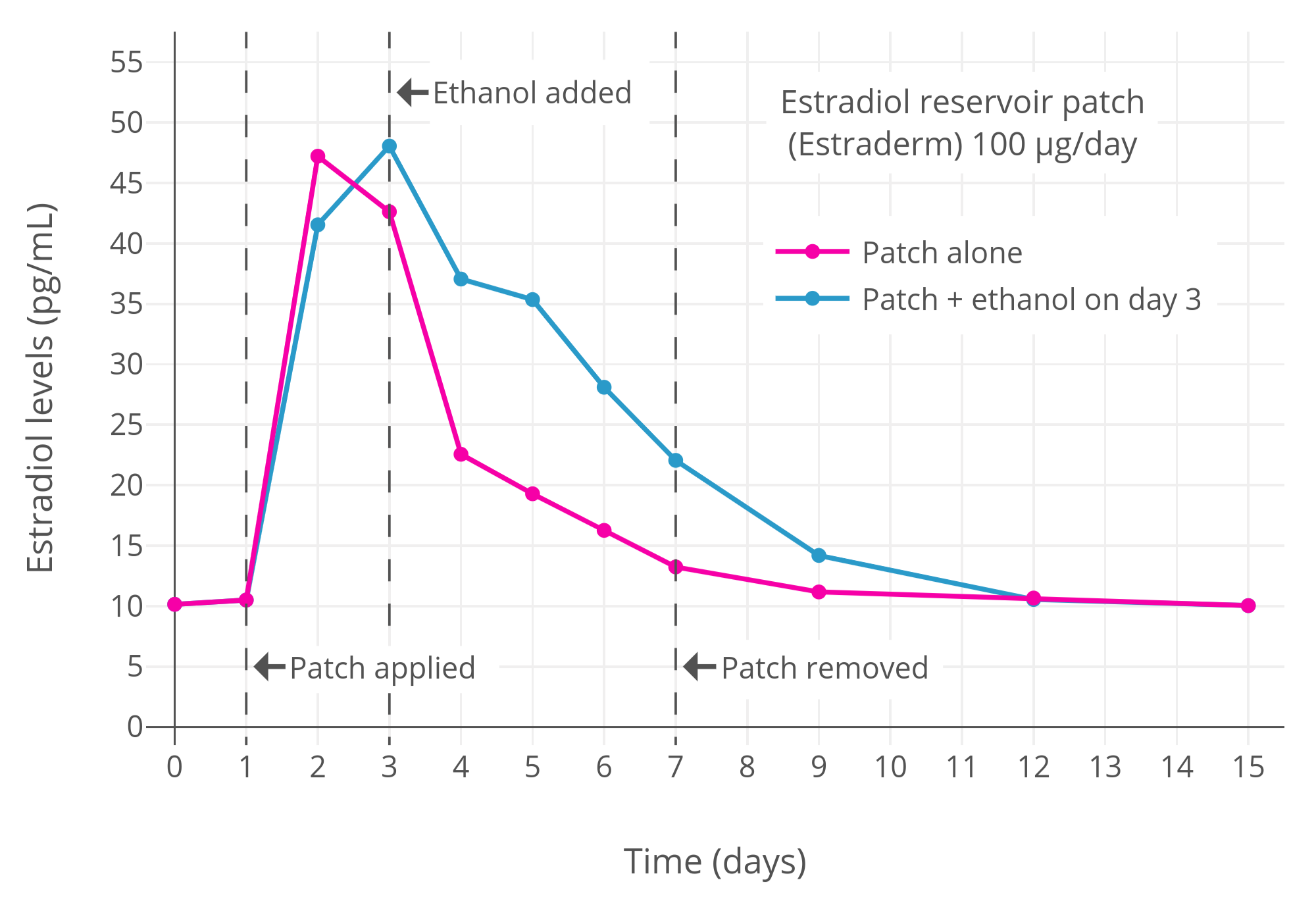
Estradiol level with a single 100 µg/day estradiol reservoir patch (Estraderm) with and without ethanol added in postmenopausal women. This patch has a 3- to 4-day duration and is designed for twice-weekly application. In one group, ethanol was injected into the area between the patch and the skin on day 3. This gave significantly higher and prolonged estradiol levels.

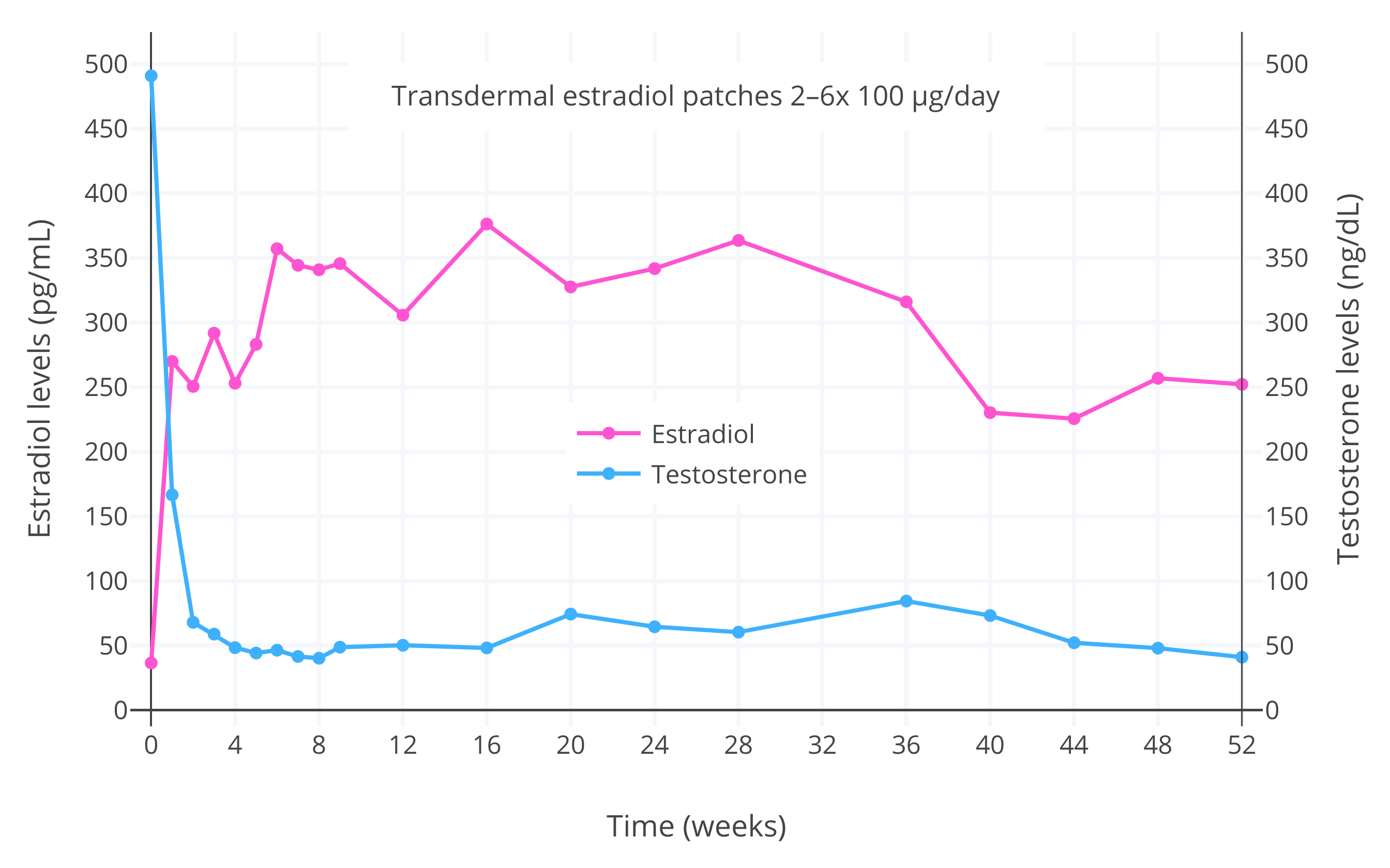
Estradiol and testosterone levels with high-dosage transdermal estradiol in the form of two to six 100 µg/day estradiol patches (Progynova TS forte) in men with prostate cancer.

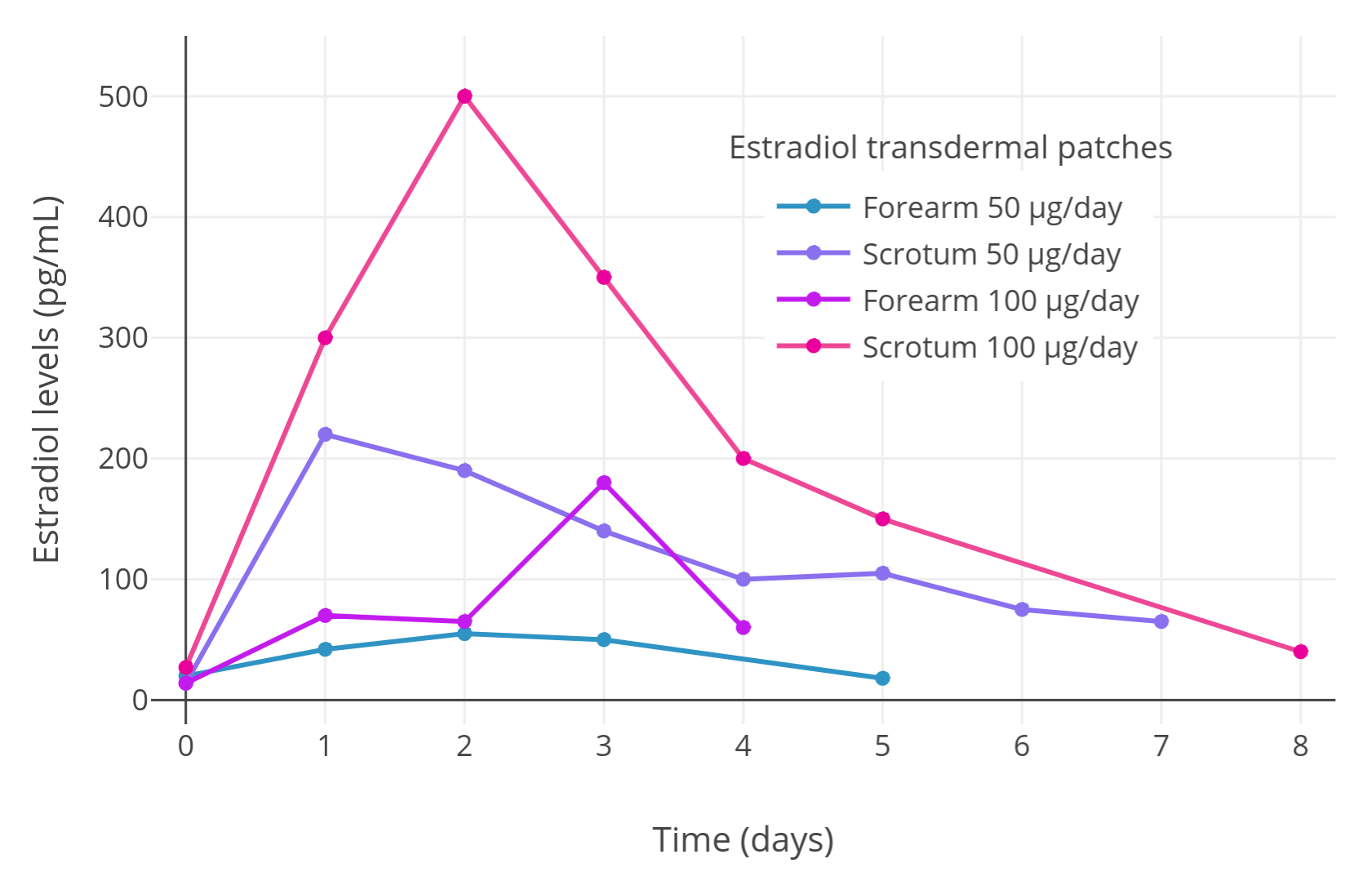
Estradiol levels with 50 to 100 μg/day transdermal estradiol patches applied to the forearm and to the scrotum in a crossover study in 2 men with prostate cancer. In 35 men treated continuously with one 100 μg/day estradiol patch scrotally, the mean estradiol level was ~500 pg/mL (range ~125–1,200 pg/mL).

==== Transdermal gel ====
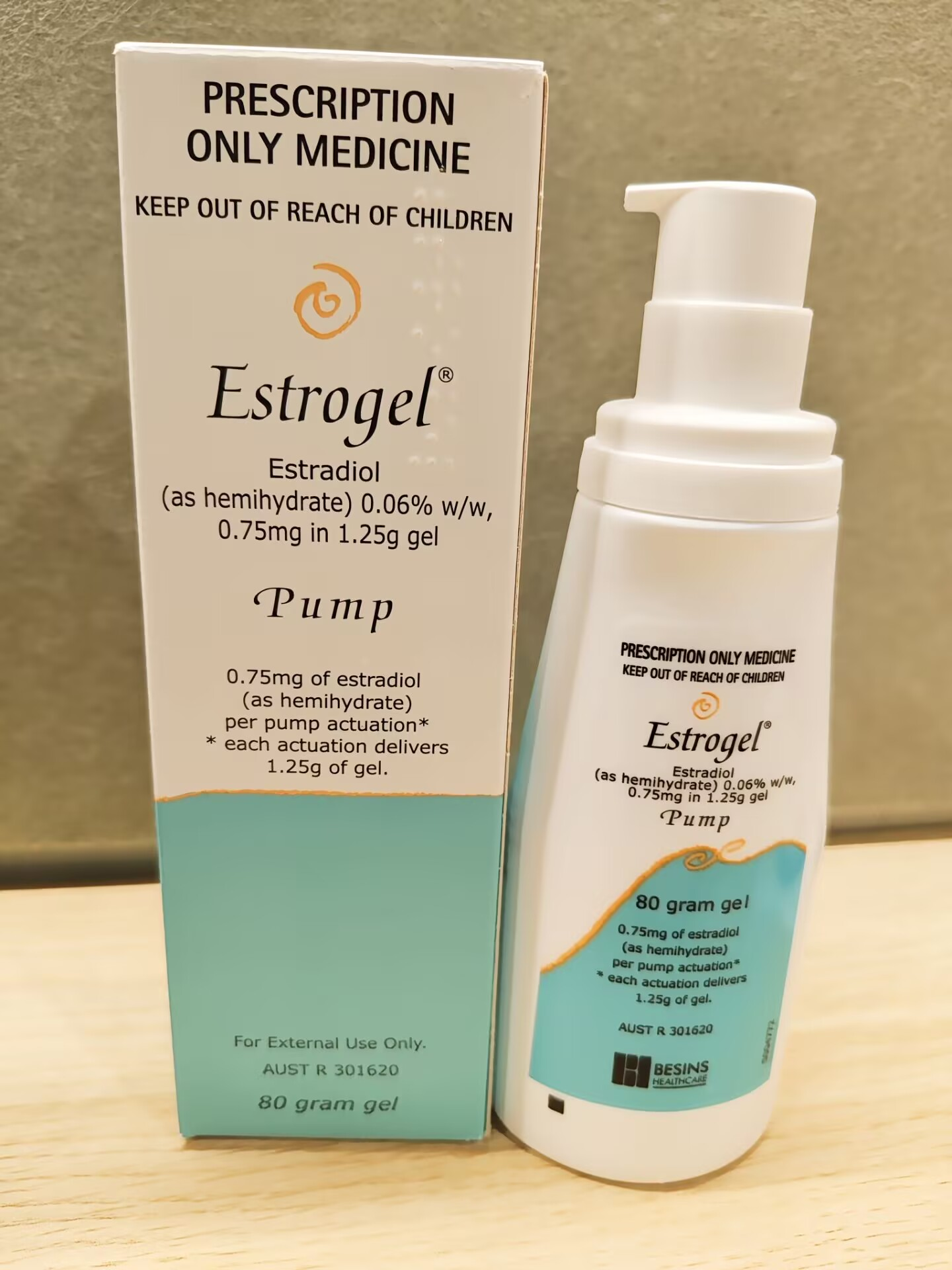
A bottle of estradiol gel sold in Australia with a prescription

Estradiol is available as a transdermal gel in the form of gel dispensers and gel packets. Major estradiol gel dispenser products include EstroGel and Elestrin while major estradiol gel packet products include DiviGel and Sandrena. Estradiol gels are administered daily. When estradiol is administered as a hydroalcoholic gel, it dries within 2 to 5 minutes following application to the skin. A single application of a transdermal estradiol gel results in a sustained increase in estradiol levels for at least 24 hours. The apparent elimination half-life of estradiol with transdermal estradiol gel is 36 hours.

Once daily application of 1.25 g topical gel containing 0.75 mg estradiol (brand name EstroGel) for 2 weeks was found to produce mean peak estradiol and estrone levels of 46.4 pg/mL and 64.2 pg/mL, respectively. The time-averaged levels of circulating estradiol and estrone with this formulation over the 24-hour dose interval were 28.3 pg/mL and 48.6 pg/mL, respectively. Levels of estradiol and estrone are stable and change relatively little over the course of the 24 hours following an application, indicating a long duration of action of this route. Steady-state levels of estradiol are achieved after 3 days of application. A higher dosage of estradiol gel containing 1.5 mg estradiol per daily application has been found to produce mean estradiol levels of 40 to 100 pg/mL and estrone levels of 90 pg/mL, while 3 mg per day has been found to result in respective mean estradiol and estrone levels of 60 to 140 pg/mL and 45 to 155 pg/mL. Topical estradiol gel at a dosage of 3 mg/day has been reported to be equipotent with 2 mg oral estradiol in terms of therapeutic effects and FSH suppression, as well as to produce similar estradiol levels. Transdermal estradiol gel produces an estradiol to estrone ratio of about 1:1.

Transdermal estradiol gel can be used as a form of high-dose estrogen in transgender women. However, the doses needed require application to a large surface of skin that amounts to the combined area of both legs for proper absorption. As a result, high-dose transdermal estradiol gel is not a primary choice of estrogen therapy for most transgender individuals. Similarly to transdermal estradiol patches, high-dose transdermal estradiol gel has been studied in the treatment of prostate cancer as well. In these studies, levels of estradiol with estradiol gel or ointment were 84 pg/mL with 3 mg/day, 185 pg/mL with 6 mg/day, 107 pg/mL with 10 mg/day, and 473 pg/mL with 20 mg/day. In women, high doses of estradiol gel, including 3 mg/day, 4 mg/day, and 8 mg/day, have been reported to produce estradiol levels of 99 pg/mL, 117 pg/mL, and 204 pg/mL, respectively.

Studies have found that topical application of estradiol to the breasts increases local levels of estradiol in breast tissue.

The total endometrial proliferation dose of transdermal estradiol gel in women has been reported to be 150 mg per cycle or 14 days. However, it has also been found that 6 mg/day estradiol gel is effective for endometrial proliferation in women.

Hormone levels with transdermal estradiol gel
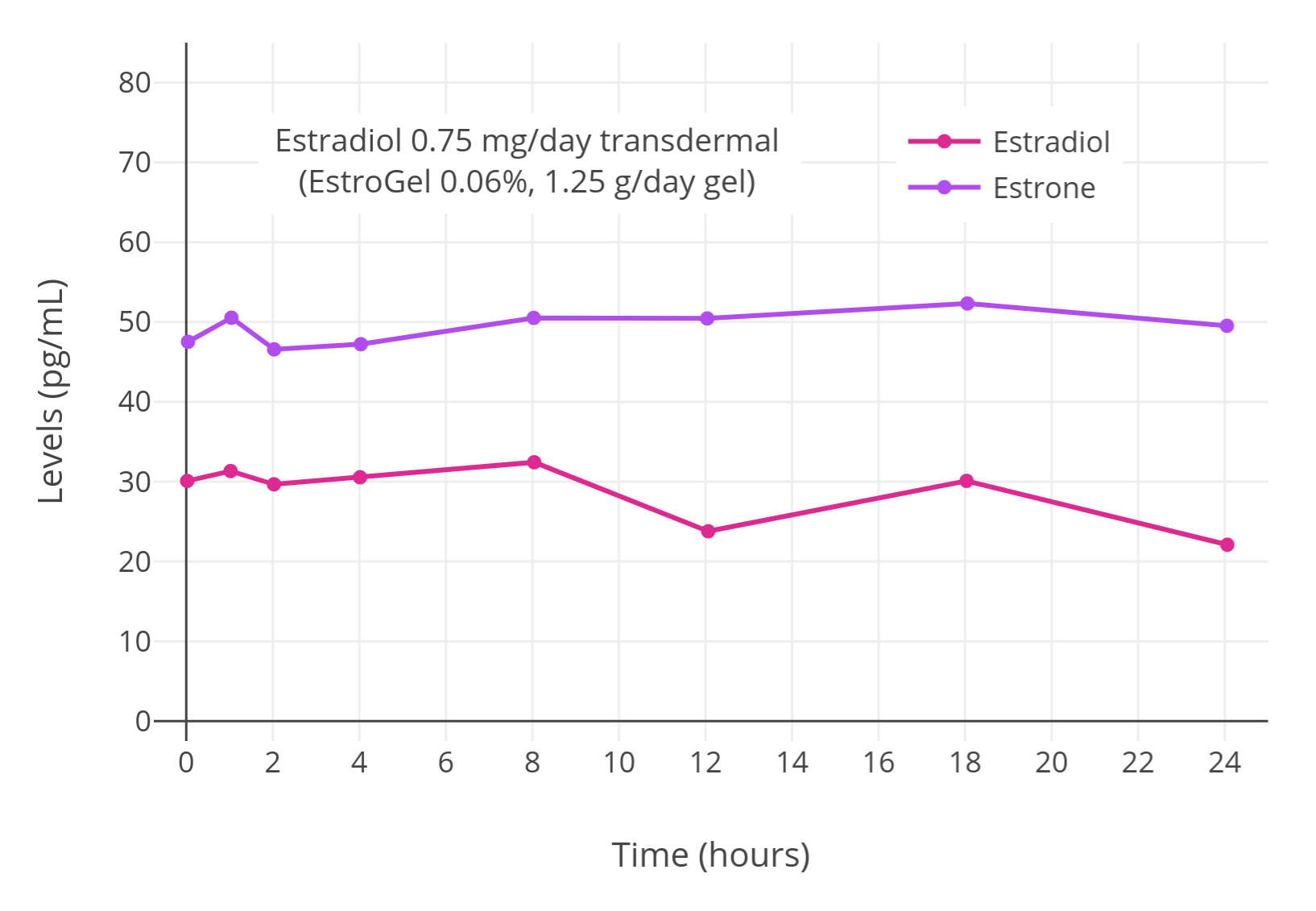
Levels of estradiol and estrone with once daily application of 1.25 g of a transdermal estradiol gel (EstroGel) containing 0.06% or 0.75 mg estradiol after 14 days of continuous therapy in postmenopausal women.

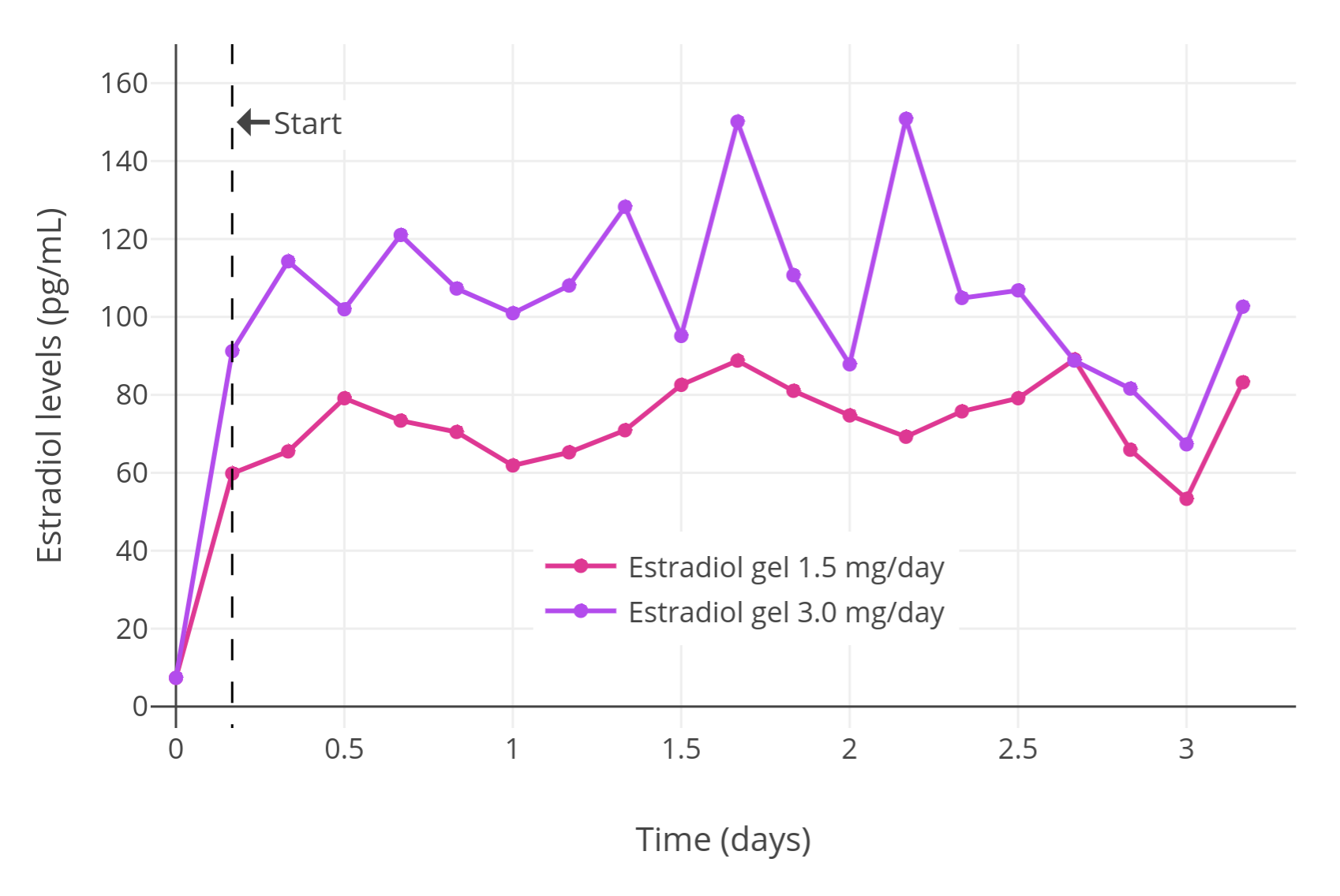
Levels of estradiol with once daily application of a transdermal estradiol gel (EstroGel) containing 1.5 or 3.0 mg estradiol over 3 days of administration in postmenopausal women.

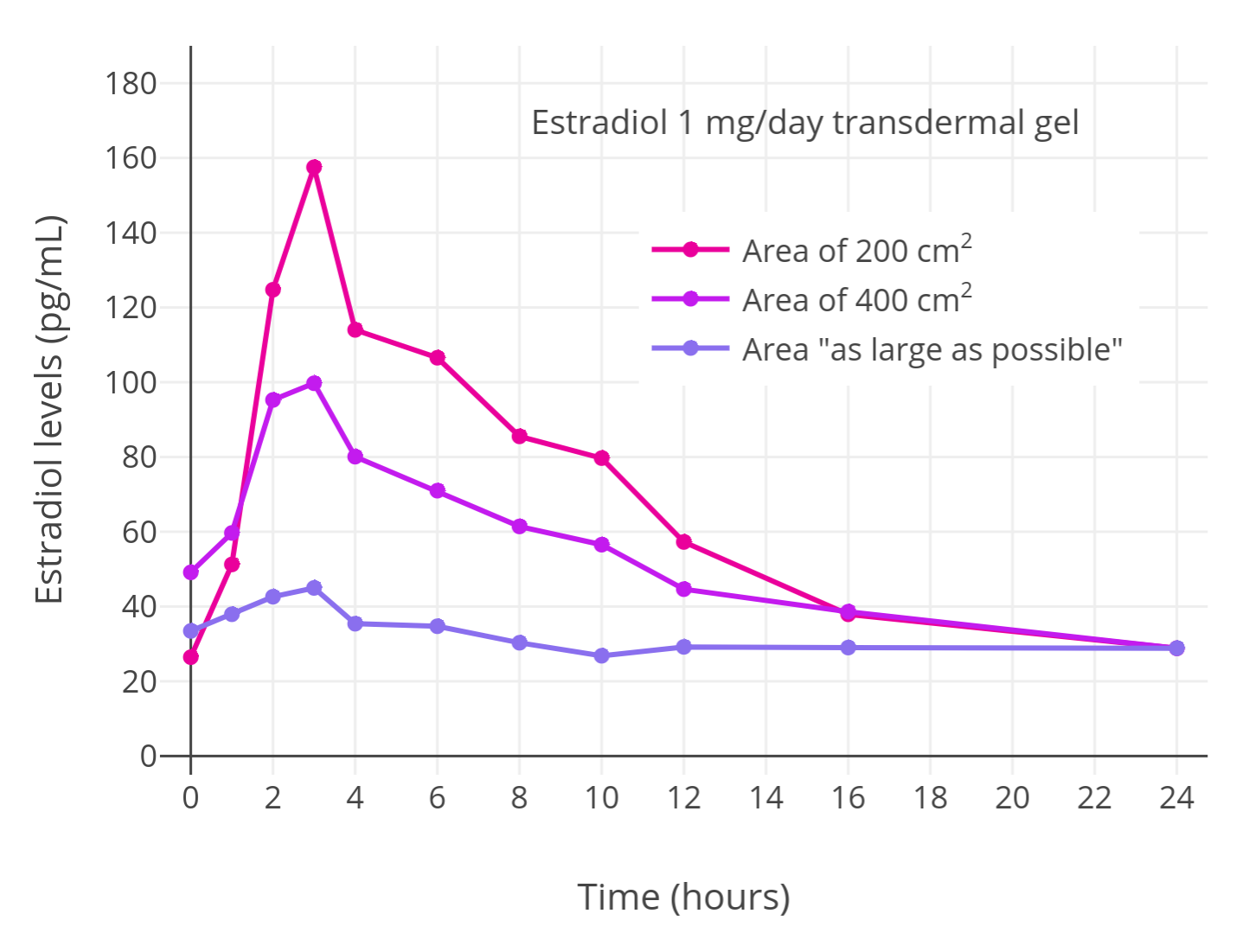
Estradiol levels after the last dose with 1 mg/day transdermal estradiol gel applied to different amounts of skin area (200 cm^{2}, 400 cm^{2}, or as large as possible) in postmenopausal women.

==== Other transdermal formulations ====
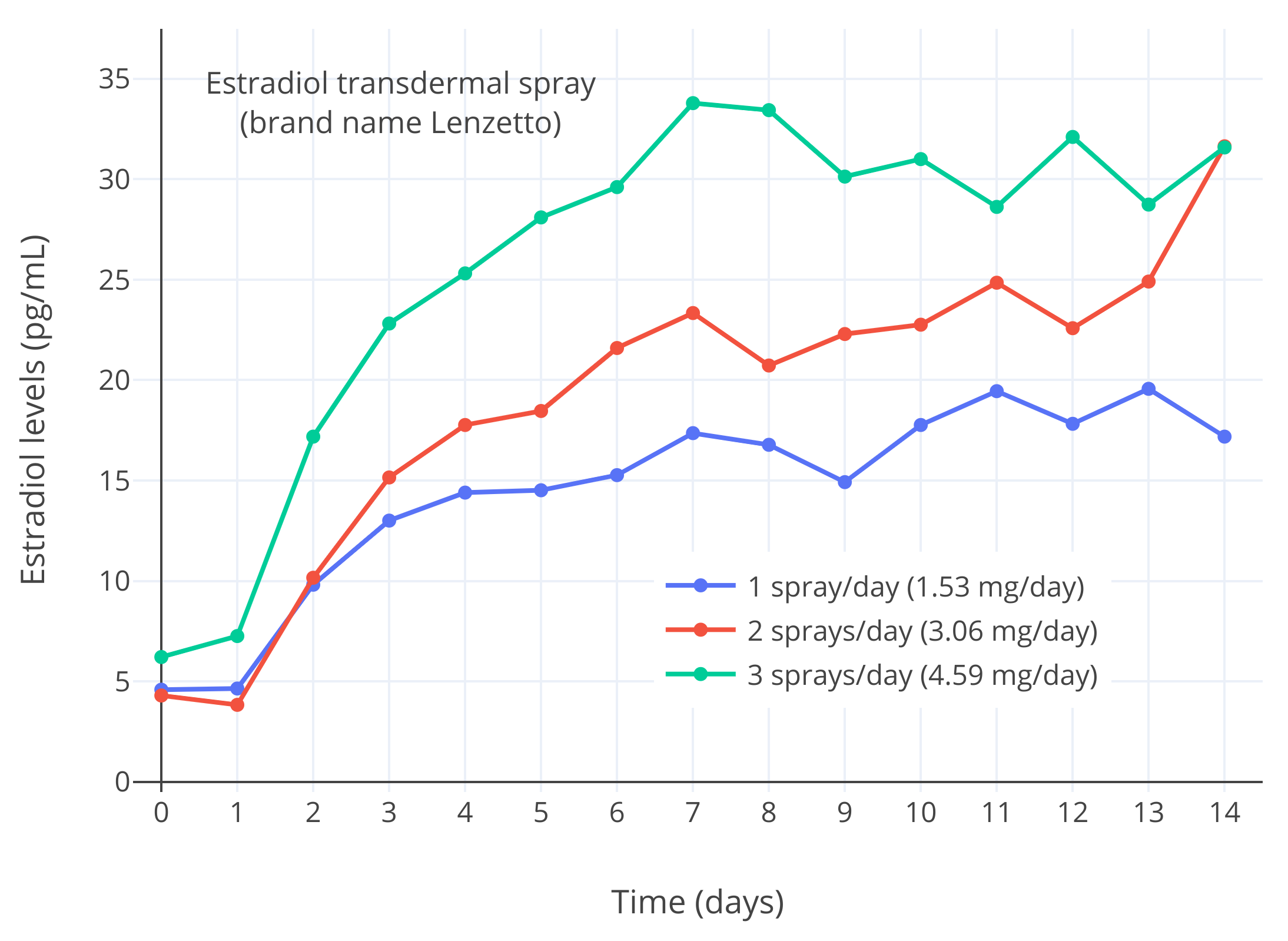
Estradiol levels with different doses of an estradiol transdermal spray (brand name Lenzetto) in postmenopausal women.

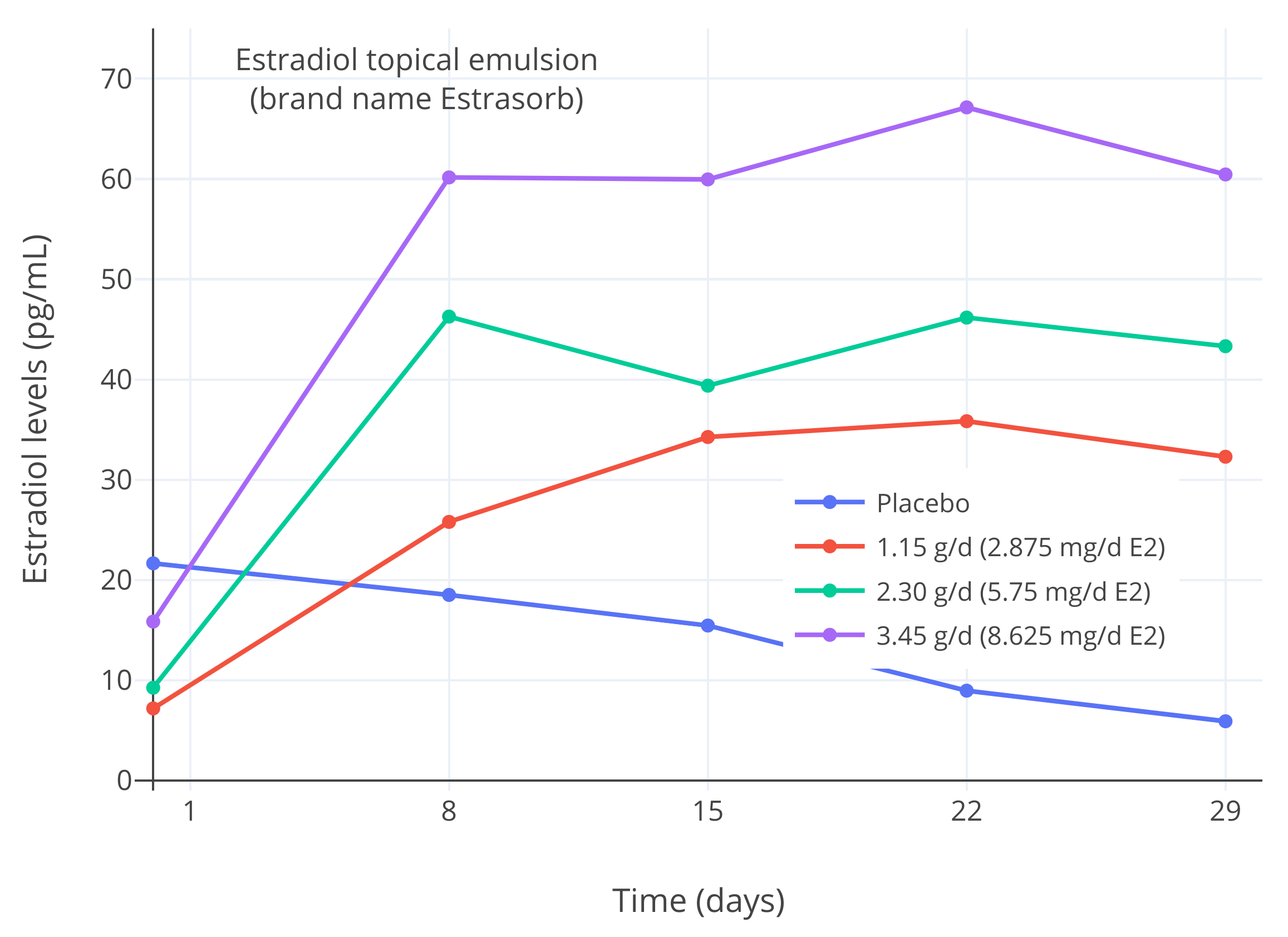
Estradiol levels with different doses of an estradiol transdermal emulsion (brand name Estrasorb) in postmenopausal women.

Estradiol is available in the form of transdermal emulsions (e.g., Estrasorb) and sprays (e.g., Lenzetto, Evamist). Estradiol emulsions and sprays are administered daily. The pharmacokinetics of these preparations have been studied.

==== Variability in pharmacokinetics ====
Transdermal estradiol patches are described as delivering a fixed amount of estradiol such as 50 μg/day or 100 μg/day. However, there is large interindividual variability and intraindividual variability in the pharmacokinetic parameters of transdermal estradiol, and fluctuations in circulating estradiol levels with estradiol patches are almost as great as with oral estradiol. As such, the actual delivery rate of estradiol and mean levels of estradiol achieved with transdermal estradiol patches may be different from what is described and from the mean levels observed in clinical studies, respectively.

A wide range of estradiol levels are measured in women using the same estradiol patch or gel and dosage, with an up to about 10-fold difference in levels. In a study of estradiol gel and patches, the maximal difference in peak levels between individuals was 11-fold for the gel and 7-fold for the patch, and the maximal difference in area-under-the-curve levels (total exposure) was 6-fold for the gel and 8-fold for the patch. It has likewise been reported that the interindividual variability in bioavailability with Estraderm reservoir patches ranges from 25 to 225%. In as many as 30% of women treated with a 50 μg/day estradiol patch, estradiol levels are low. There are also significant short-term intraindividual differences in estradiol levels with estradiol patches; estradiol levels can fluctuate considerably from hour to hour. In addition, estradiol levels with estradiol patches are higher in the evening than in the morning, which may be due to circadian variations in skin blood flow that may influence absorption. In terms of area-under-the-curve levels of estradiol, the interindividual variability of transdermal estradiol has been found to be 20 to 44% using different transdermal formulations, and the intraindividual variability with transdermal estradiol has been found to be 20%.

Factors which may contribute to inter- and intraindividual variability with transdermal estradiol include skin location and thickness; hair follicle density; solvent (alcohol) evaporation; skin dehydration, ambient temperature, and humidity; and reservoir size.

=== Vaginal administration ===
Vaginal estradiol is available in the forms of tablets, creams, inserts or suppositories, and rings. Vaginal estradiol tablets, creams, and inserts are usually administered once daily to twice weekly, whereas vaginal estradiol rings have a sustained action and are replaced once every 90 days. Vaginal estradiol can be used both as a systemic form of estradiol therapy, and at very low doses to selectively achieve a local vaginal effect without systemic effects, for instance in the treatment of menopausal symptoms such as vaginal atrophy and dryness.

Vaginal estradiol is rapidly and almost completely absorbed. The absorption of vaginal estradiol is slightly greater in women with vaginal atrophy. Vaginal estradiol has high bioavailability and greatly increased potency compared to oral estradiol, with about 10- to 20-fold the comparative potency of oral estradiol. The greater potency of vaginal estradiol relative to oral estradiol is due to the lack of the first pass associated with oral estradiol and due to low local metabolism of estradiol in the vagina. Because of the high estradiol levels achieved, LH and FSH are more strongly suppressed with vaginal estradiol than with other routes.

A daily dosage of 0.5 mg vaginal micronized estradiol has been found to result in estradiol and estrone levels of 250 pg/mL and 130 pg/mL, respectively. Vaginal estradiol has a much higher estradiol-to-estrone ratio in comparison to oral estradiol. The average ratio of estradiol to estrone with vaginal estradiol is 5:1, compared to 1:5 in the case of oral estradiol, a 10-fold difference.

As vaginal estradiol is not subject to a first pass and bypasses the intestines and liver, it does not affect liver protein synthesis at menopausal replacement dosages, similarly to transdermal estradiol. On the other hand, a first pass effect in the uterus may occur with vaginal administration of estradiol and this may have implications for uterine safety.

Hormone levels with vaginal estradiol
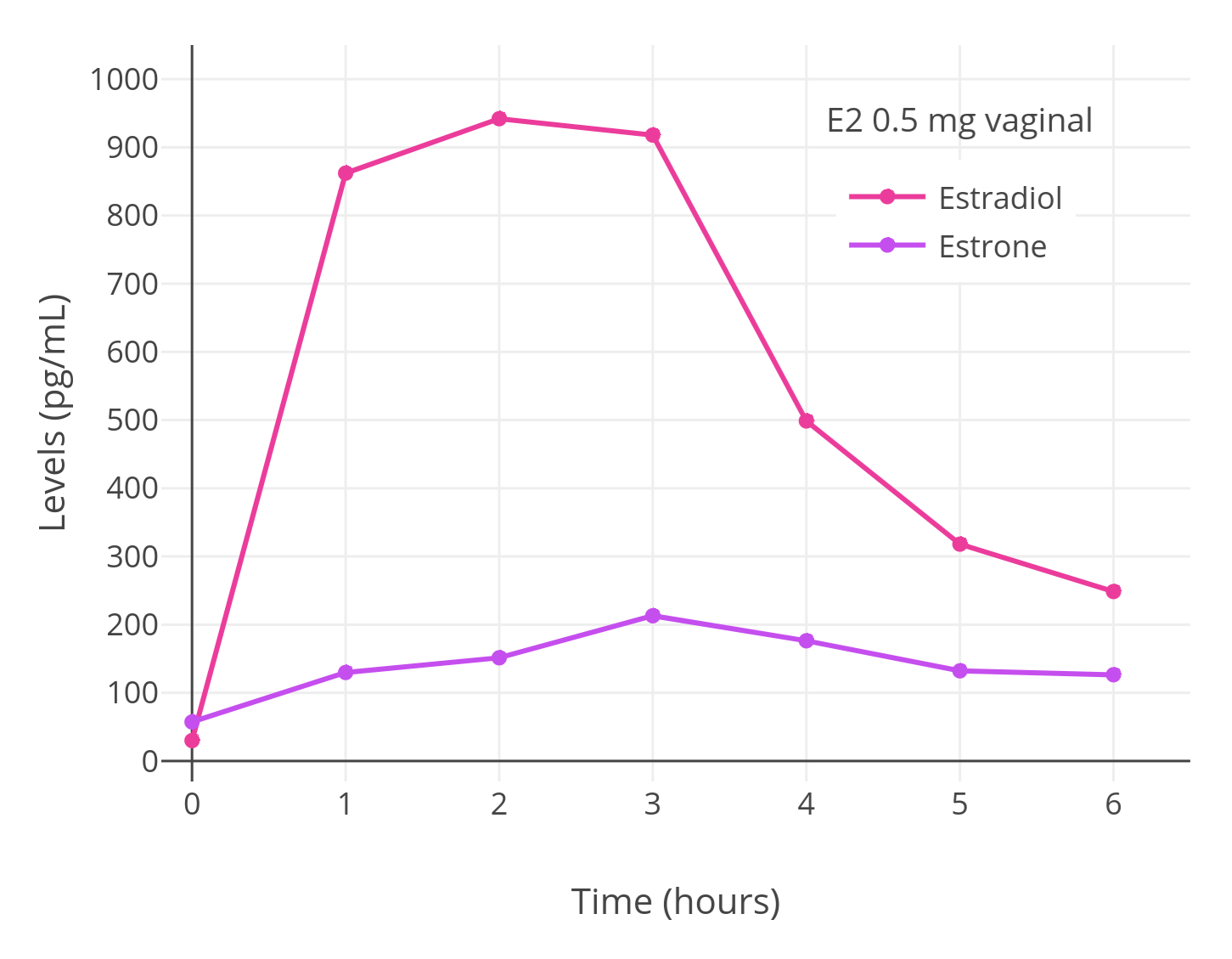
Estrogen levels with a single vaginal application of 0.5 mg micronized estradiol in 2 mL solution in postmenopausal women.

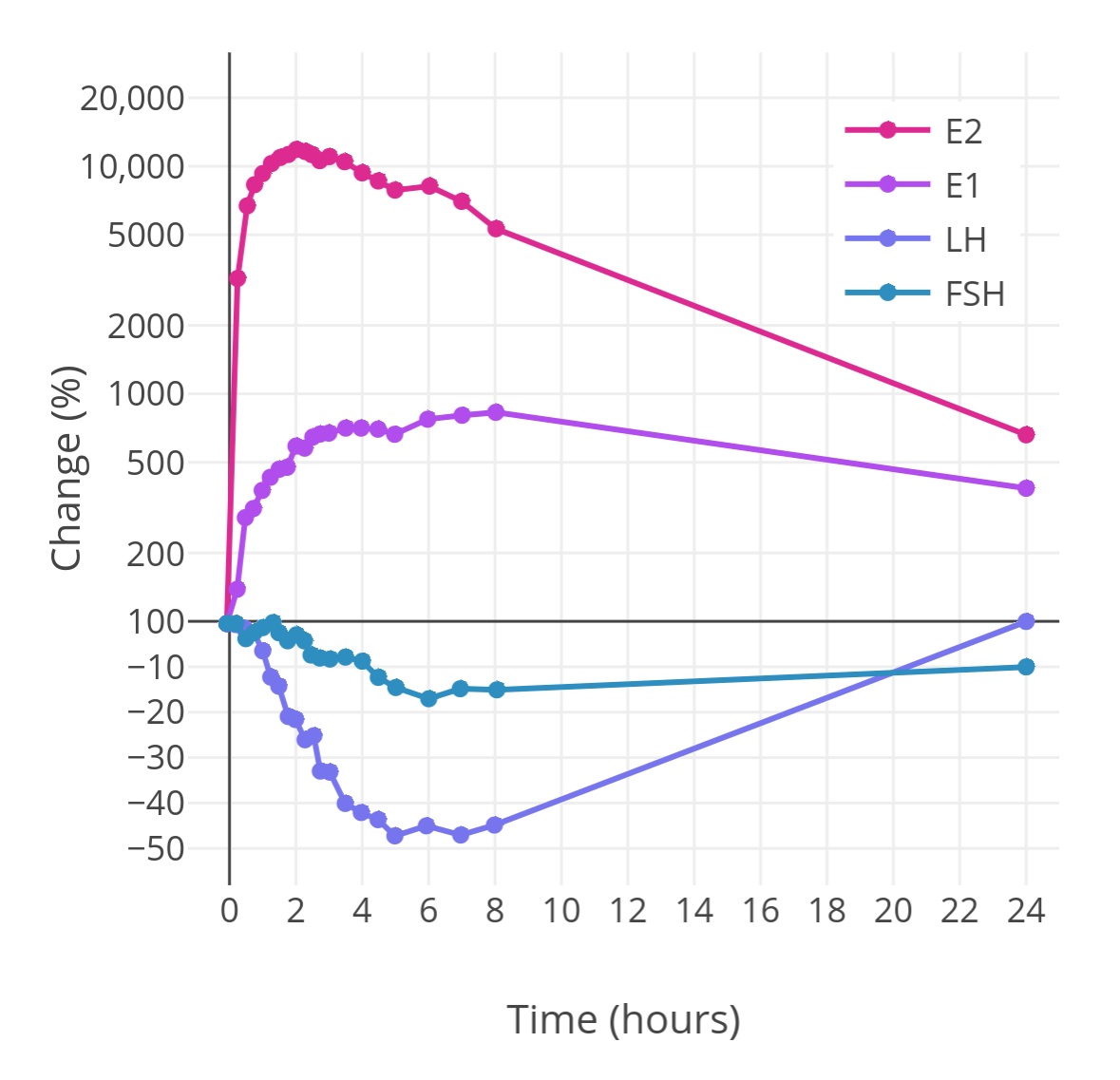
Percent change in estradiol, estrone, LH, and FSH levels with a single vaginal application of 1 mg micronized estradiol in saline in hypoestrogenic women.

=== Rectal administration ===
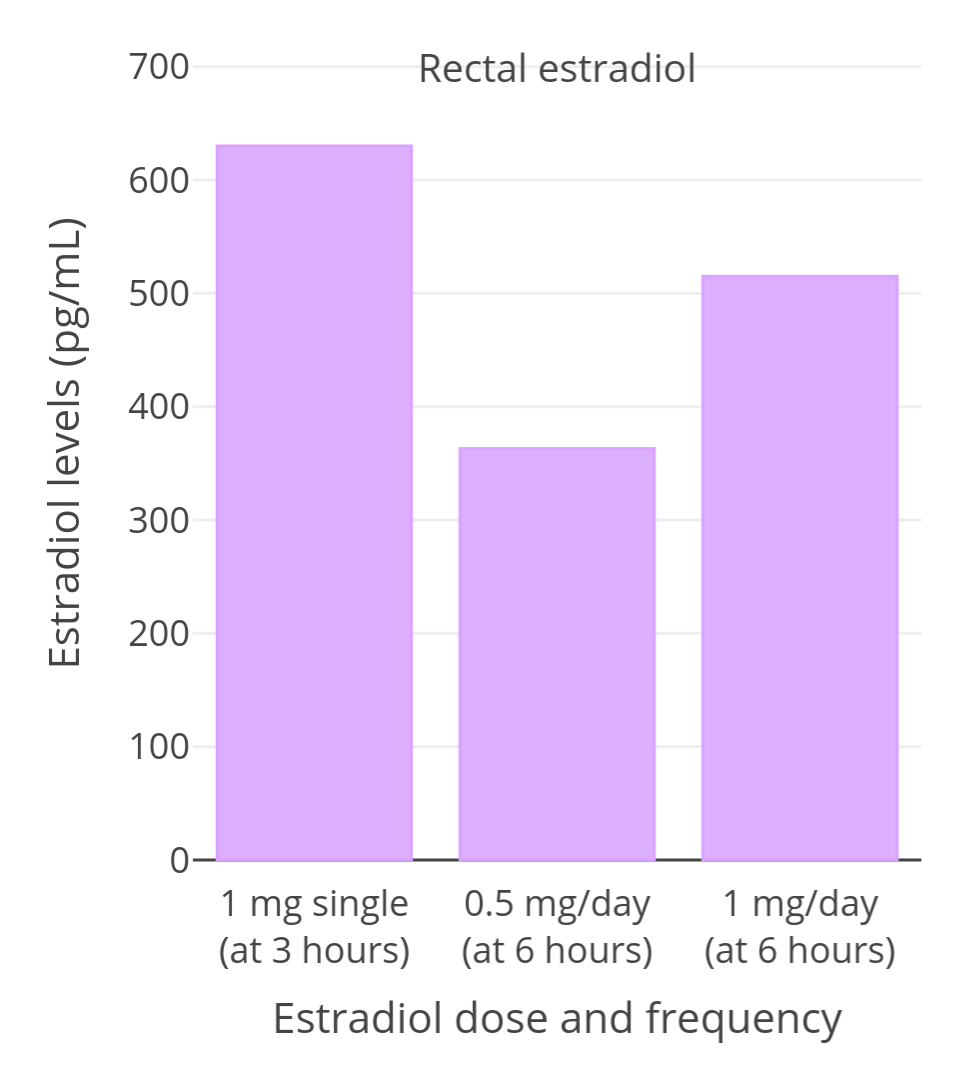
Estradiol levels with rectal administration of estradiol in women after a single 1 mg dose 3 hours post-dose, with 0.5 mg/day 6 hours after the last dose, and with 1 mg/day 6 hours after the last dose.

Estradiol has been assessed for use by rectal administration in a number of studies. Uses of estradiol by this route have included treatment of menopausal symptoms in postmenopausal women. Rectal administration of estradiol is described as qualitatively and quantitatively similar to vaginal administration of estradiol. The use of estradiol by the rectal route considerably bypasses the liver and hence the first-pass metabolism that occurs with oral estradiol, similarly to other parenteral routes of estradiol such as vaginal and transdermal administration. Irritation of the intestines does not usually occur with rectal estradiol. The use of estradiol by the rectal route is not well-accepted by all individuals, and due to its inconvenience, it has been said that rectal administration of estradiol has gained no practical clinical importance.

Lauritzen (1986) reported that 3 hours after a single rectal dose of 1 mg micronized estradiol, estradiol levels increased by 620 pg/mL and estrone levels increased by 120 pg/mL. Subsequently, Lauritzen (1987, 1990) reported that 0.5 mg/day and 1 mg/day rectal estradiol resulted in respective estradiol levels of 363 pg/mL and 515 pg/mL 6 hours following the last dose. These estradiol levels are fairly similar to those achieved by vaginal estradiol. The estradiol-to-estrone ratio of rectal estradiol is about 5:1, which likewise is the same as that of vaginal estradiol. Absorption of rectal estradiol occurs rapidly within 30 to 60 minutes, maximal estradiol levels occur at 3 hours post-dose, and circulating estradiol levels are reportedly maintained for 4 to 10 hours. The duration of rectal estradiol is said to necessitate repeated administration 1 to 2 times per day.

Rectal administration of estriol, which has similar properties to estradiol, has also been studied. Administration of a rectal suppository containing 100 mg estriol resulted in estriol levels in pregnant women at term increasing by about 53%. Estriol levels at term are normally between 5,000 and 20,000 pg/mL, which suggests that estriol levels may have increased following the suppository by about 5,000 to 10,000 pg/mL (precise levels were not provided).

=== Intramuscular injection ===
Intramuscular injections are injections into muscle, for instance the gluteal or deltoid muscle. Estradiol and estradiol esters can be administered in a variety of forms by intramuscular injection. Aqueous solutions of estradiol and estradiol esters by intramuscular injection have a rapid onset and duration analogously to but slightly more delayed than intravenous injection. However, intramuscular injections of oil solutions, crystalline aqueous suspensions, and emulsions of estradiol and estradiol esters, as well as solutions and suspensions of estradiol polymers and estradiol microspheres, act as long-lasting depot injections.

Estradiol esters, including but not limited to estradiol benzoate, estradiol valerate, estradiol cypionate, estradiol enanthate, and estradiol undecylate, are inactive prodrugs of estradiol that are converted into estradiol in the body. The aforementioned estradiol esters are fatty acid esters and are more lipophilic (fat-soluble) than estradiol. More lipophilic compounds are absorbed more slowly from the injection site when given by depot intramuscular injection (as oil solutions, aqueous suspensions, and emulsions), and hence more lipophilic estradiol esters have longer durations than free estradiol or less lipophilic estradiol esters via this route. Polyestradiol phosphate is a polymer of the hydrophilic (water-soluble) estradiol ester estradiol phosphate which circulates in the blood but is metabolized into estradiol very slowly.

The bioavailability of estradiol and estradiol esters given by intramuscular injection is said to be essentially complete. For comparison, the bioavailability of oral estradiol is around 5%. The estradiol levels that result with typical clinical doses of estradiol and estradiol esters by intramuscular injection tend to be high compared to the typical estradiol levels that occur with other clinically used routes and forms of estradiol.

Potencies and durations of natural estrogens by intramuscular injection
Estrogen	Form	Dose (mg)		Duration by dose (mg)
Estrogen	Form	EPD	CICD	Duration by dose (mg)
Estradiol	Aq. soln.	?	–	<1 d
Estradiol	Oil soln.	40–60	–	1–2 ≈ 1–2 d
Estradiol	Aq. susp.	?	3.5	0.5–2 ≈ 2–7 d; 3.5 ≈ >5 d
Estradiol	Microsph.	?	–	1 ≈ 30 d
Estradiol benzoate	Oil soln.	25–35	–	1.66 ≈ 2–3 d; 5 ≈ 3–6 d
Estradiol benzoate	Aq. susp.	20	–	10 ≈ 16–21 d
Estradiol benzoate	Emulsion	?	–	10 ≈ 14–21 d
Estradiol dipropionate	Oil soln.	25–30	–	5 ≈ 5–8 d
Estradiol valerate	Oil soln.	20–30	5	5 ≈ 7–8 d; 10 ≈ 10–14 d; 40 ≈ 14–21 d; 100 ≈ 21–28 d
Estradiol benz. butyrate	Oil soln.	?	10	10 ≈ 21 d
Estradiol cypionate	Oil soln.	20–30	–	5 ≈ 11–14 d
Estradiol cypionate	Aq. susp.	?	5	5 ≈ 14–24 d
Estradiol enanthate	Oil soln.	?	5–10	10 ≈ 20–30 d
Estradiol dienanthate	Oil soln.	?	–	7.5 ≈ >40 d
Estradiol undecylate	Oil soln.	?	–	10–20 ≈ 40–60 d; 25–50 ≈ 60–120 d
Polyestradiol phosphate	Aq. soln.	40–60	–	40 ≈ 30 d; 80 ≈ 60 d; 160 ≈ 120 d
Estrone	Oil soln.	?	–	1–2 ≈ 2–3 d
Estrone	Aq. susp.	?	–	0.1–2 ≈ 2–7 d
Estriol	Oil soln.	?	–	1–2 ≈ 1–4 d
Polyestriol phosphate	Aq. soln.	?	–	50 ≈ 30 d; 80 ≈ 60 d
Notes and sources Notes: All aqueous suspensions are of microcrystalline particle size. Estradiol production during the menstrual cycle is 30–640 µg/d (6.4–8.6 mg total per month or cycle). The vaginal epithelium maturation dosage of estradiol benzoate or estradiol valerate has been reported as 5 to 7 mg/week. An effective ovulation-inhibiting dose of estradiol undecylate is 20–30 mg/month. Sources: See template.

==== Aqueous solutions ====
Aqueous solutions are solutions of a compound with water. In contrast to other formulations, such as oil solutions, aqueous suspensions, and emulsions, aqueous solutions of estradiol and estradiol esters by intramuscular injection are not depot injections. Instead, they are rapidly absorbed and eliminated, analogously to intravenous injections of estradiol and estradiol esters. The durations of aqueous solutions of estradiol and estradiol esters by intramuscular injection are measured in hours.

==== Oil solutions ====
Oil solutions are solutions of a compound with oil, for instance sesame oil or castor oil. When free steroids like estradiol are administered in oil solution by intramuscular injection, they are rapidly absorbed and the duration is relatively short. A single 1 to 2 mg dose of estradiol in oil solution by intramuscular injection has a duration of about 1 or 2 days. Little prolongation of duration is achieved with the use of larger doses. Nonetheless, the duration of estradiol in oil solution by intramuscular injection is significantly longer than an intravenous injection of estradiol or estradiol valerate, which show a duration of only a few hours.

Conversely, intramuscular injections of estradiol esters in oil solution have durations of days to months, depending on the ester administered. Following a single 4 or 5 mg intramuscular injection in oil solution, peak estradiol levels are about 950 pg/mL with estradiol benzoate after 2 days, 400 to 650 pg/mL with estradiol valerate after 2 days, and 250 to 350 pg/mL with estradiol cypionate after 4 days. The durations with a 5 mg dose are 4 or 5 days with estradiol benzoate, 7 or 8 days with estradiol valerate, and 11 to 14 days with estradiol cypionate. The differences in estradiol levels and the different durations with estradiol levels are due to their different rates of release from the oily depot at the injection site. The longer and hence more lipophilic the fatty acid ester, the slower the release from the depot, the lower the peak estradiol levels, and the longer the duration.

The duration of estradiol esters in oil solution by intramuscular injection is dose-dependent. With estradiol valerate, it is reported that a dose of 5 mg has a duration of 7 to 8 days, 10 mg a duration of 10 to 14 days, 40 mg a duration of 2 to 3 weeks, and 100 mg a duration of 3 to 4 weeks. High doses of estradiol valerate, such as 40 mg per week, can achieve pregnancy levels of estradiol. A study of pseudopregnancy with intramuscular injections of 40 mg/week estradiol valerate and 250 mg/week hydroxyprogesterone caproate observed estradiol levels of about 2,500 to 3,000 pg/mL.

Pharmacokinetics of three estradiol esters by intramuscular injection
Estrogen	Dose	C_{max}	T_{max}	Duration
Estradiol benzoate	5 mg	E2: 940 pg/mL; E1: 343 pg/mL	E2: 1.8 days E1: 2.4 days	4–5 days
Estradiol valerate	5 mg	E2: 667 pg/mL; E1: 324 pg/mL	E2: 2.2 days E1: 2.7 days	7–8 days
Estradiol cypionate	5 mg	E2: 338 pg/mL; E1: 145 pg/mL	E2: 3.9 days E1: 5.1 days	11 days
Notes: All via i.m. injection of oil solution. Determinations via radioimmunoassay with chromatographic separation. Sources: See template.

==== Aqueous suspensions ====
Aqueous suspensions are suspensions of crystal particles of a compound in water. Estradiol in microcrystalline aqueous suspension for use by intramuscular injection was previously marketed in the 1950s under brand names such as Aquadiol, Diogyn, Progynon Aqueous Suspension, and Progynon Micropellets. It was used at a dose of 0.5 to 1.5 mg 2 or 3 times per week. Newman (1950) found that 0.5 to 2 mg once per week was satisfactory. As such, the preparation presumably had a duration in the range of 2 to 7 days.

Microcrystalline aqueous suspensions of estradiol esters, for instance of estradiol benzoate (brand names Agofollin Depot alone and Follivirin in combination with testosterone isobutyrate), have been found to have longer duration of actions than oil solutions of the same esters when administered via intramuscular injection. Whereas the duration of a single intramuscular injection of amorphous estradiol benzoate in oil solution is 6 days, the duration of a single intramuscular injection of microcrystalline estradiol benzoate in aqueous suspension is 16 to 21 days.

The duration of crystalline aqueous suspensions is highly dependent on crystal size. Steroids and steroid fatty acid esters are lipophilic and have very low water solubility. When they are suspended in the form of crystals in water, these crystals dissolve slowly, releasing steroid from their surfaces in the process. The larger the particle sizes of the crystals, the slower the dissolution rate. When a crystalline aqueous suspension of steroid is administered via intramuscular injection, a crystalline depot suspended in fluid is formed locally within the muscle. These crystals slowly dissolve and the steroid is gradually absorbed into the body, resulting in the long durations of such preparations. Particle sizes of 10 μm or less have no apparent depot effect.

A larger needle size is needed for aqueous suspensions of steroids to allow the steroid crystals to pass through the needle lumen. Aqueous suspensions pose a risk of injection site reactions such as local irritation, swelling, and redness, with often severe pain. The reactions are worse with larger crystal sizes. Particle sizes of more than 300 μm in the case of estradiol benzoate have been found to be too painful for use. The local injection site reactions, which do not occur with oil solutions, have limited the clinical use of aqueous suspensions of estradiol and its esters as well as other steroids.

==== Emulsions ====
Emulsions are mixtures of immiscible liquids. Water-in-oil emulsions of estradiol benzoate were evaluated as long-acting preparations for use by intramuscular injection in the 1940s and 1950s. Formulations of estradiol benzoate alone under the brand name Menformon-Emulsion and with progesterone under the brand name Di-Pro-Emulsion were previously marketed. A 10 mg dose of estradiol benzoate in emulsion by intramuscular injection is said to have a duration of about 2 to 3 weeks. This is similar to the duration of an aqueous suspension of 10 mg estradiol benzoate or an oil solution of 10 mg estradiol valerate. Emulsions of steroids by intramuscular injection have similar properties (e.g., duration) relative to aqueous suspensions. Painful injection site reactions have been reported with emulsions similarly to suspensions.

==== Polymers ====
Polymers are large molecules of repeating subunits. Polyestradiol phosphate (brand name Estradurin) is a water-soluble estradiol ester in the form of a polymer and a very slowly hydrolyzed prodrug of estradiol. It is formulated as an aqueous solution and is given by intramuscular injection. The medication has an exceptionally long duration of action, with an elimination half-life of about 70 days or 10 weeks following a single injection. Estradiol levels during polyestradiol phosphate therapy are very constant and uniform. Levels of estradiol after 6 months of treatment with polyestradiol phosphate were about 350, 450, and 650 pg/mL with doses of 160, 240, and 320 mg once per month, respectively. Polyestradiol phosphate has mostly been discontinued and remains available only in a few countries.

==== Microspheres ====
Microspheres are microscopic spherical particles which can be used to encapsulate compounds. Estradiol is available in the form of an aqueous suspension of 1.0 mg estradiol in microspheres for use by intramuscular injection once a month under the brand name Juvenum E in Mexico. It achieves circulating estradiol levels of 163 pg/mL to 219 pg/mL in the first 3 to 12 hours following injection, which decrease to 42 to 66 pg/mL during the first 4 days post-injection and to 20 to 35 pg/mL after 8 days, with levels remaining in this range thereafter over 30 days. These estradiol levels are similar to the normal levels that occur during the early follicular phase of the menstrual cycle in premenopausal women (24 to 75 pg/mL). The elimination of the formulation follows three phases: a rapid phase in the first 2 days, a second phase during days 2 to 12 days with a biological half-life of 7 to 10 days, and a third phase in which estradiol levels remain elevated above baseline for up to 30 days.

==== Graphs ====
Hormone levels with estradiol and estradiol esters by intramuscular injection
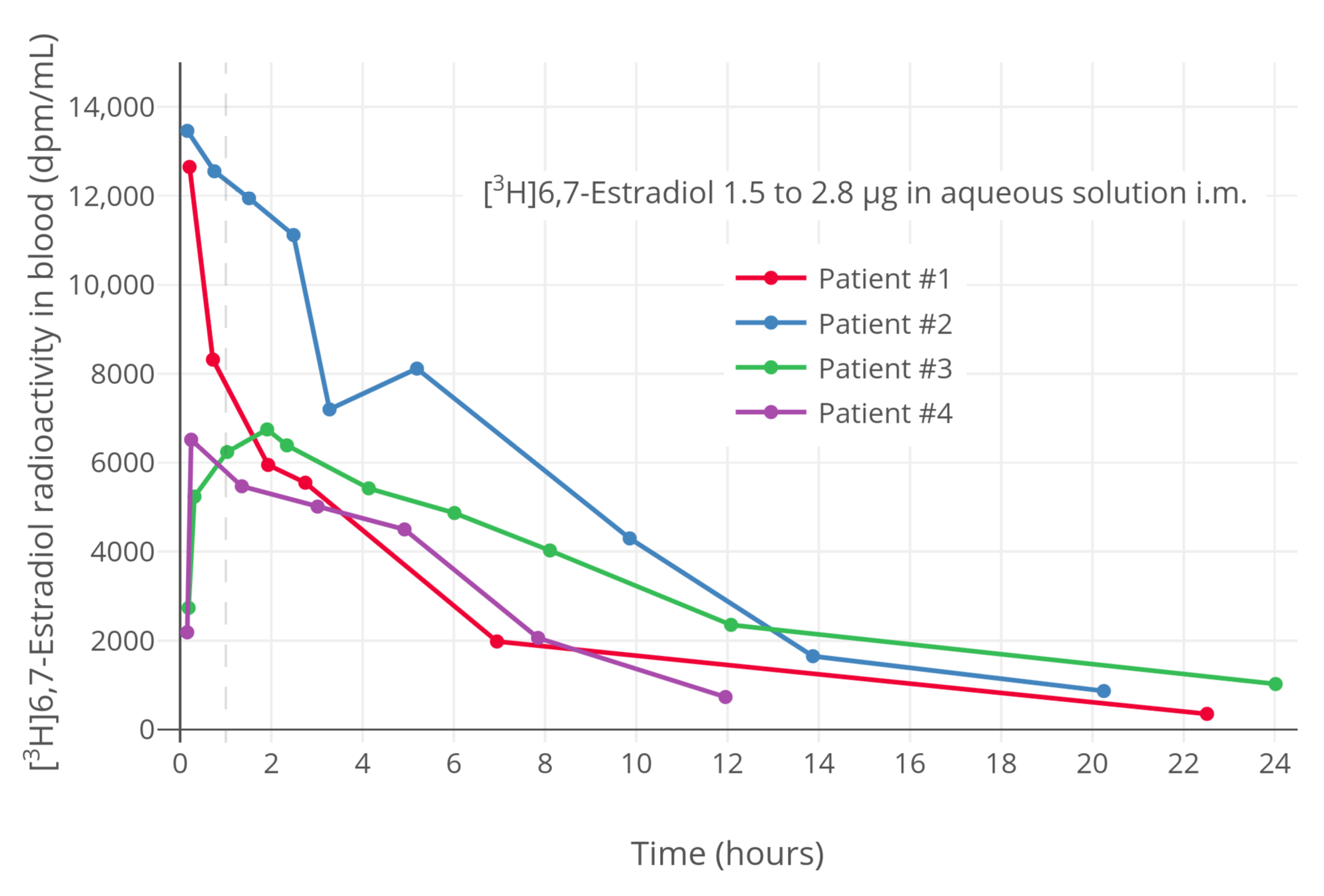
Tritiated estradiol radioactivity in blood with a single intramuscular injection of 1.5 to 2.8 μg tritiated estradiol in aqueous solution in four women. Peak blood radioactivity occurred within 15 minutes in three of the women and in the remaining woman after 2 hours. Source: Davis et al. (1963).

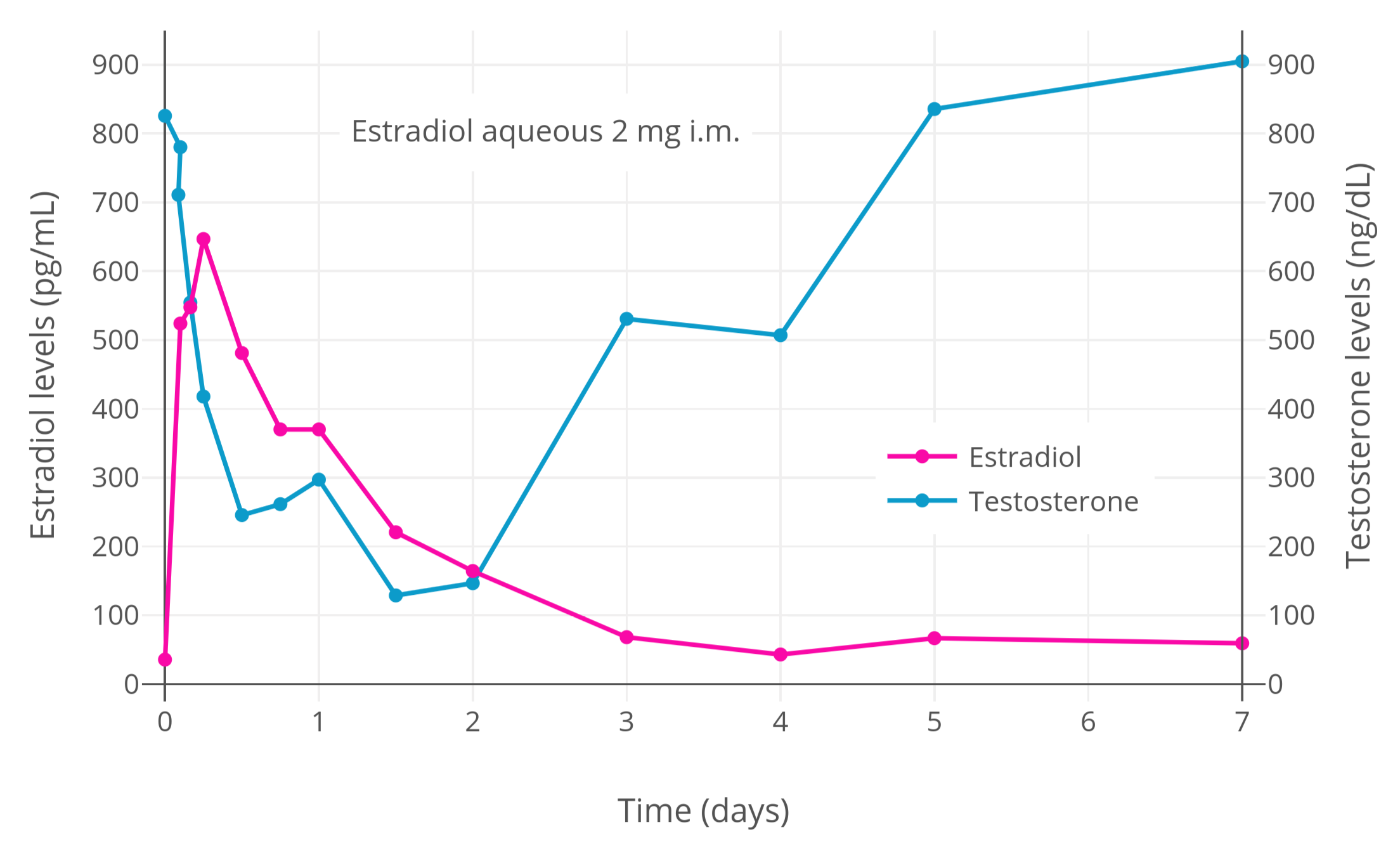
Estradiol and testosterone levels with a single intramuscular injection of 2 mg estradiol in an aqueous preparation in healthy young men. Type of aqueous preparation (solution or suspension) was not specified. Source: Jones et al. (1978).

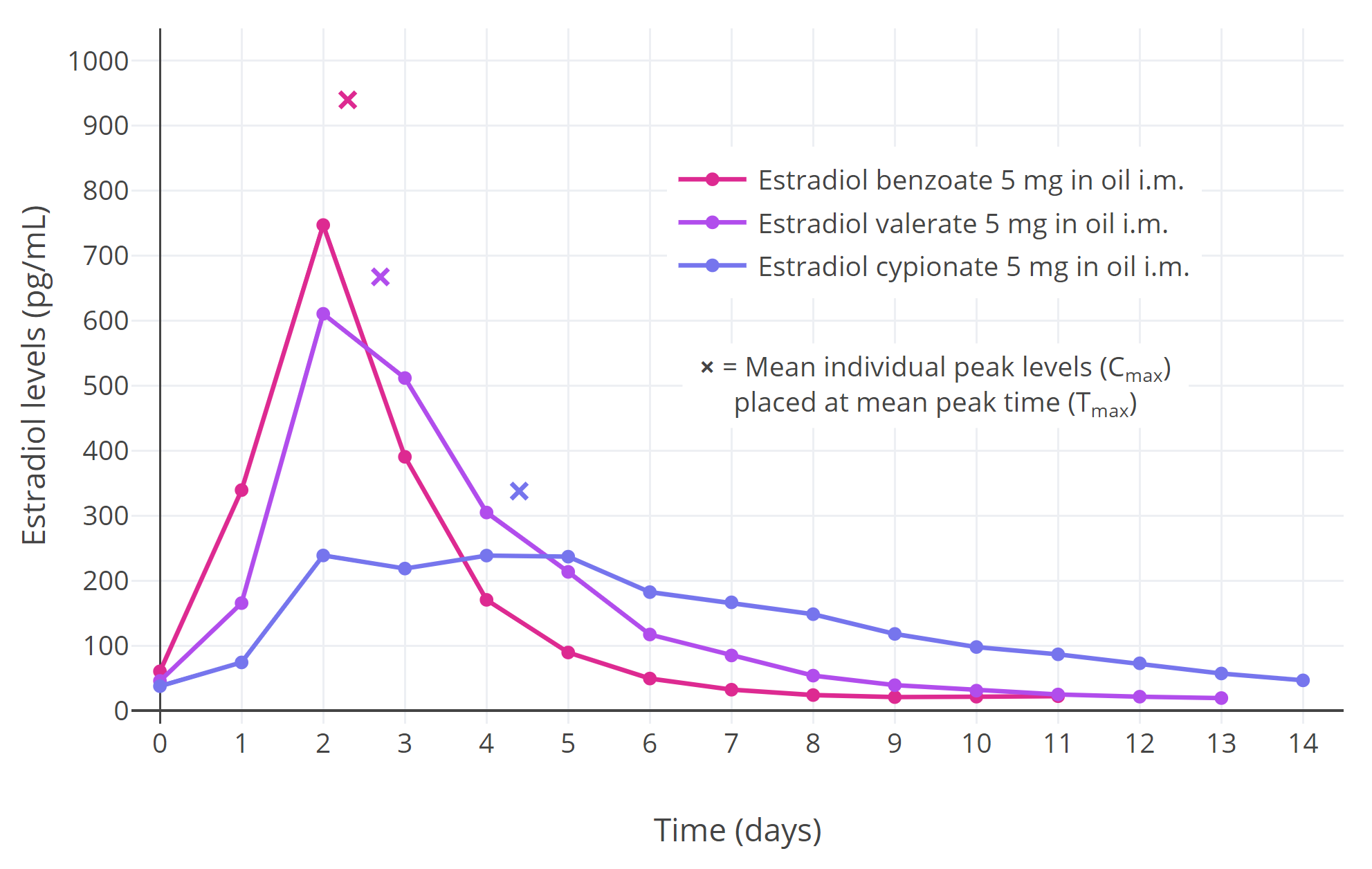
Estradiol levels after a single intramuscular injection of 5 mg estradiol benzoate, 5 mg estradiol valerate, or 5 mg estradiol cypionate in oil solution in women. Source: Oriowo et al. (1980).

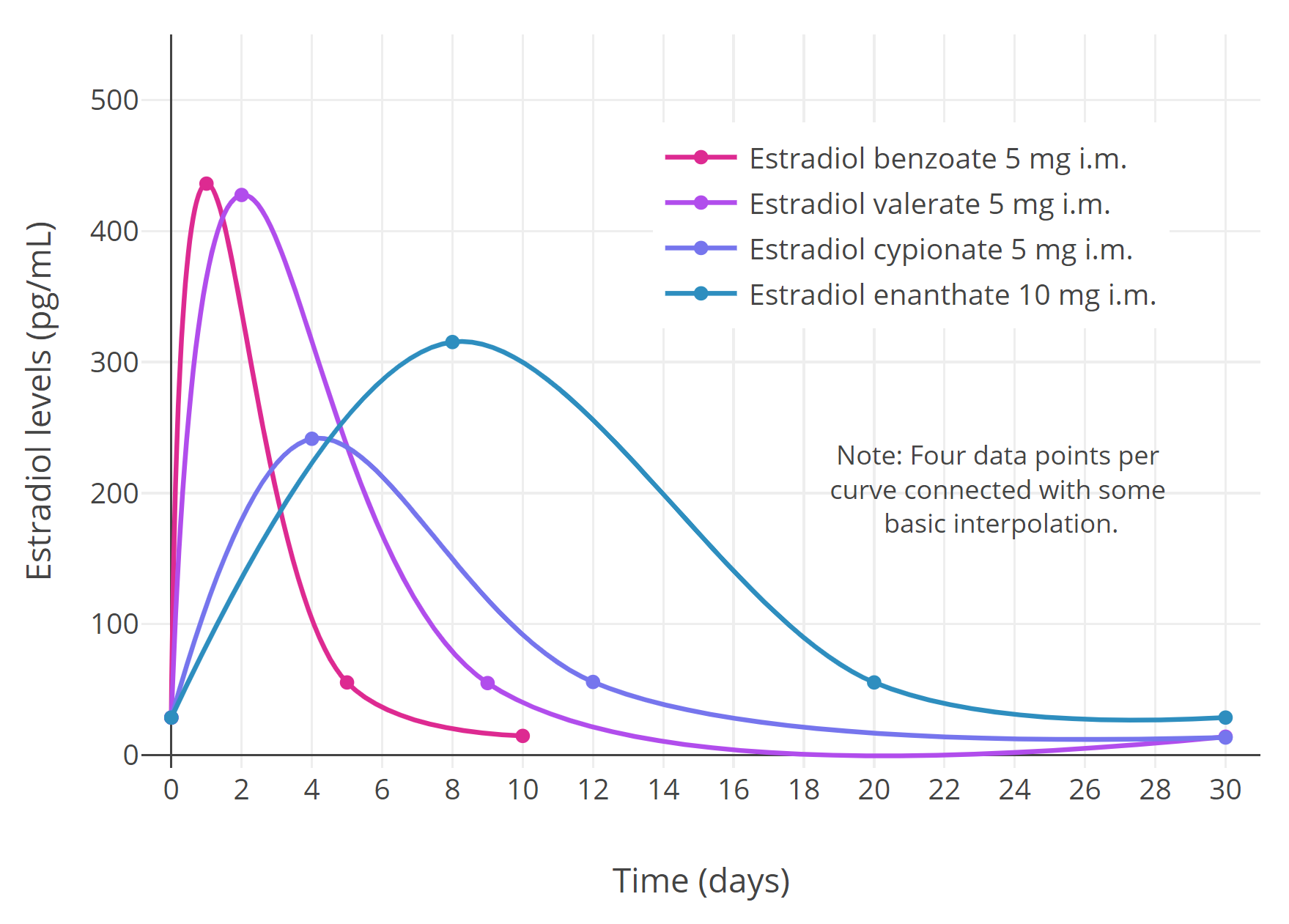
Simplified curves of estradiol levels after intramuscular injection of different 5 mg estradiol benzoate, 5 mg estradiol valerate, 5 mg estradiol cypionate, or 10 mg estradiol enanthate in oil solution in women. Source: Garza-Flores (1994).

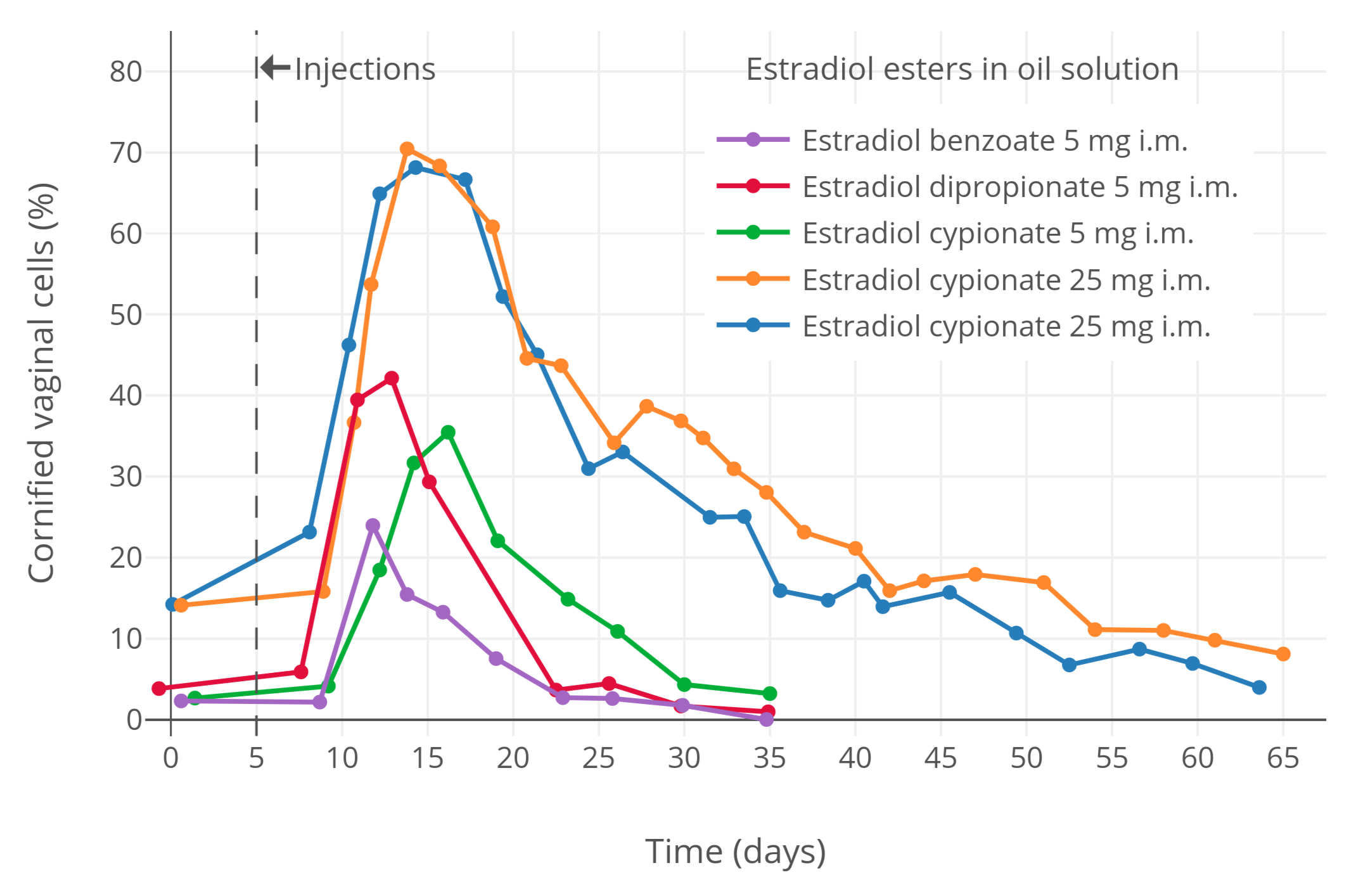
Vaginal cornification with a single intramuscular injection of 5 mg estradiol benzoate, 5 mg estradiol dipropionate, or 5 to 25 mg estradiol cypionate in oil solution in women. Source: Schwartz & Soule (1955).

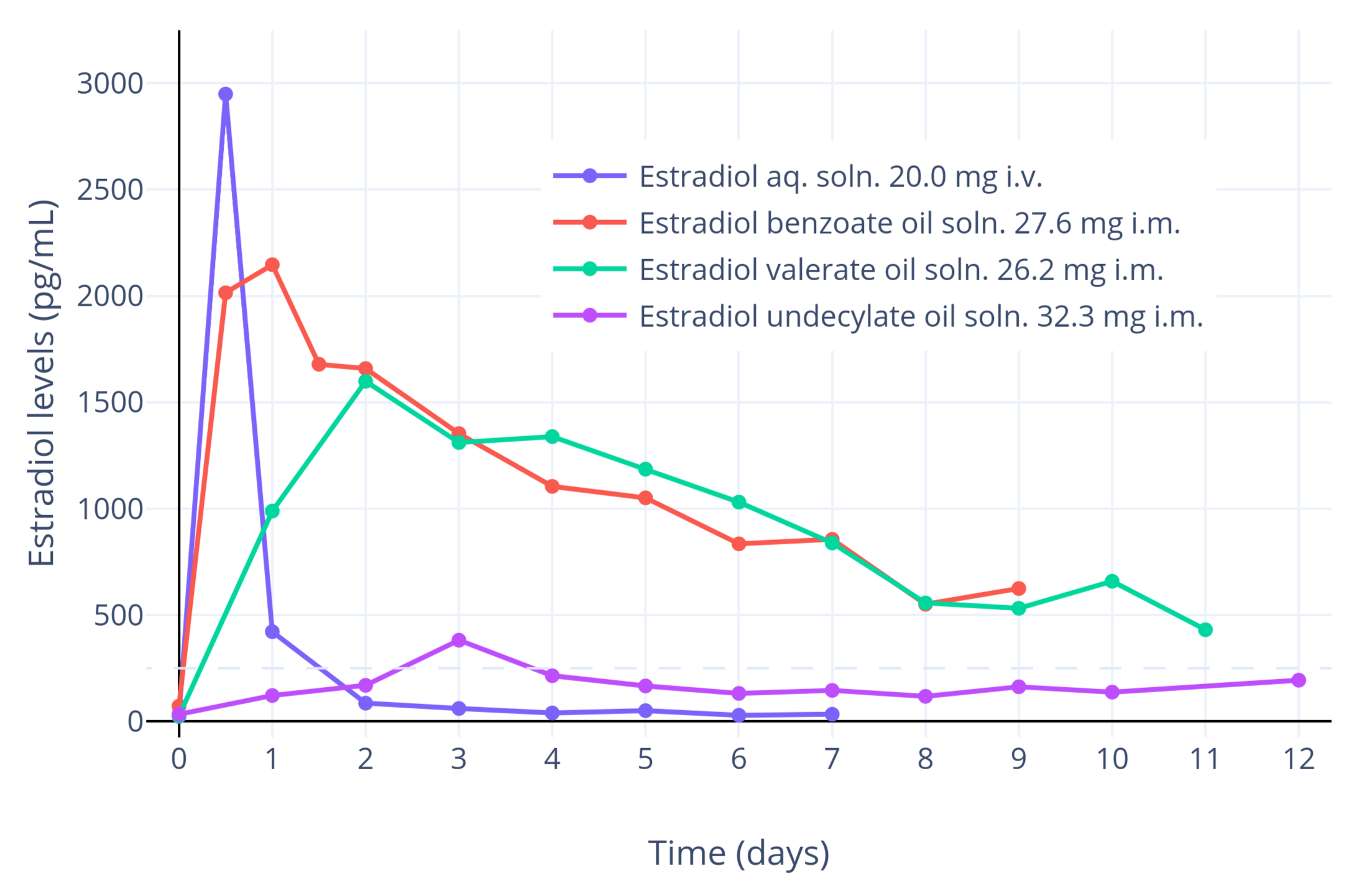
Estradiol levels after a short intravenous infusion of 20 mg estradiol in aqueous solution or an intramuscular injection of an equimolar dose of estradiol benzoate, estradiol valerate, or estradiol undecylate in oil solution in women. Sources: Geppert (1975) and Leyendecker et al. (1975).

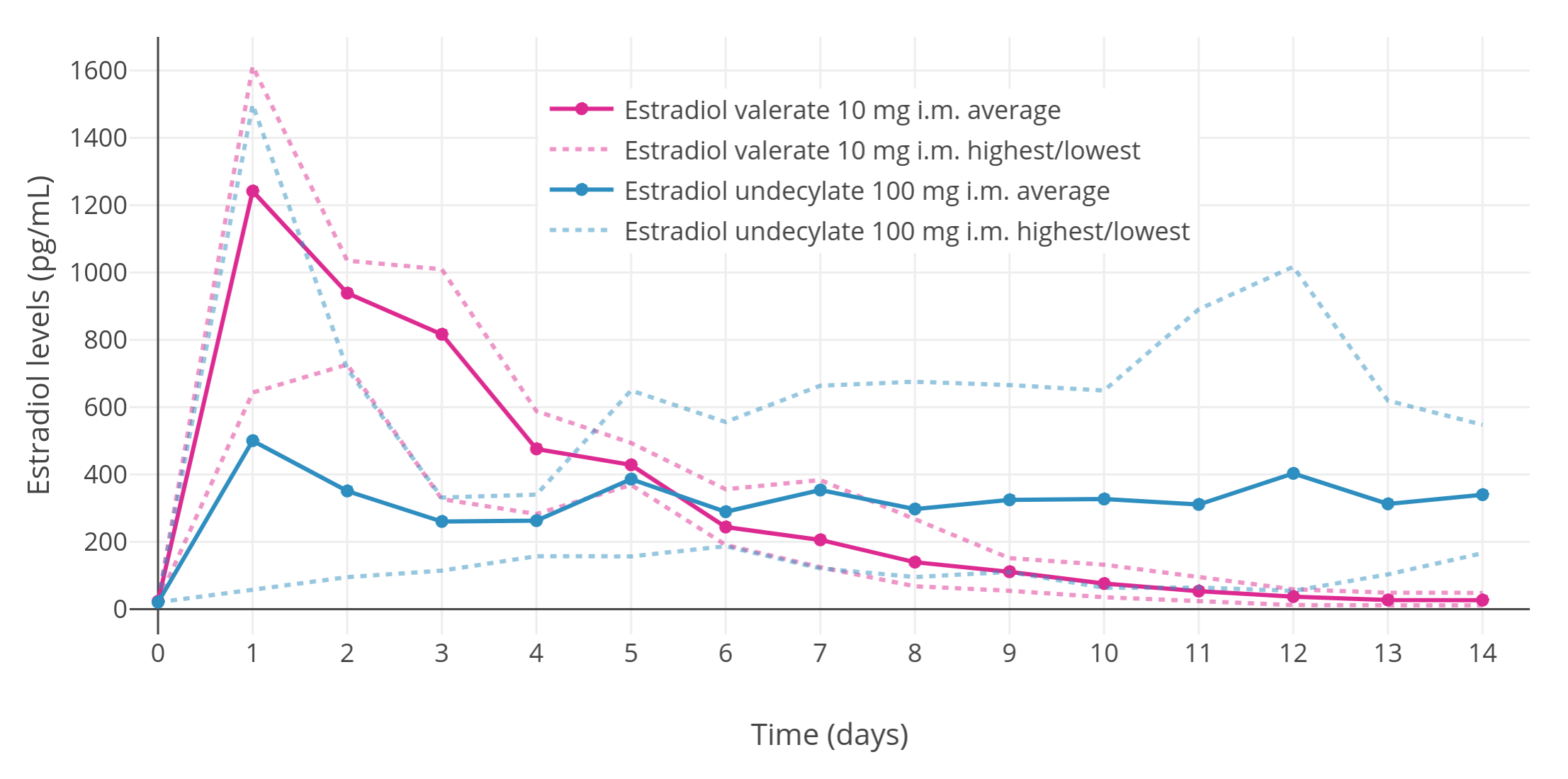
Estradiol levels after a single intramuscular injection of 10 mg estradiol valerate or 100 mg estradiol undecylate in oil solution. Source: Vermeulen (1975).

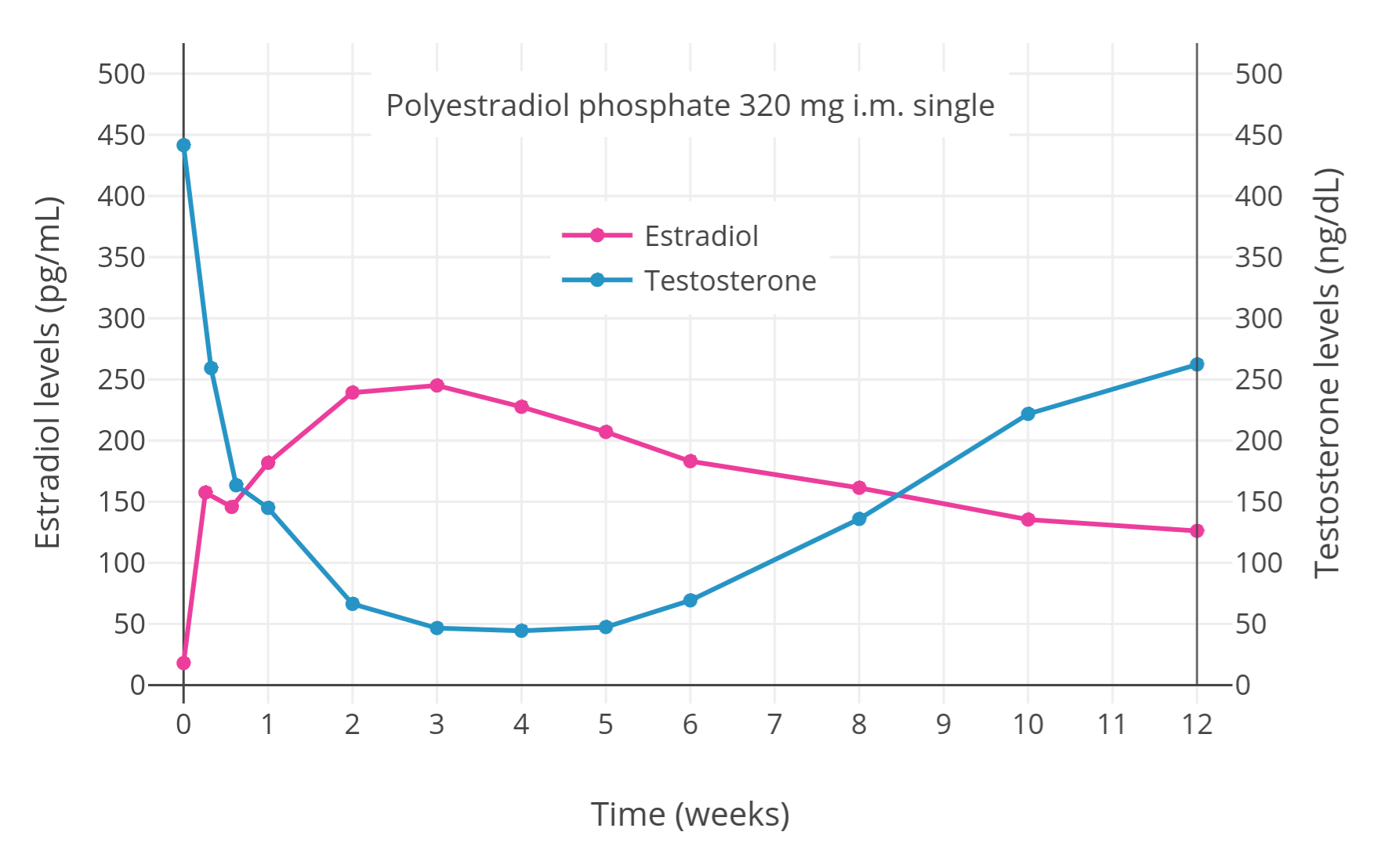
Estradiol and testosterone levels after a single intramuscular injection of 320 mg polyestradiol phosphate in aqueous solution in men with prostate cancer. Source: Stege et al. (1996).

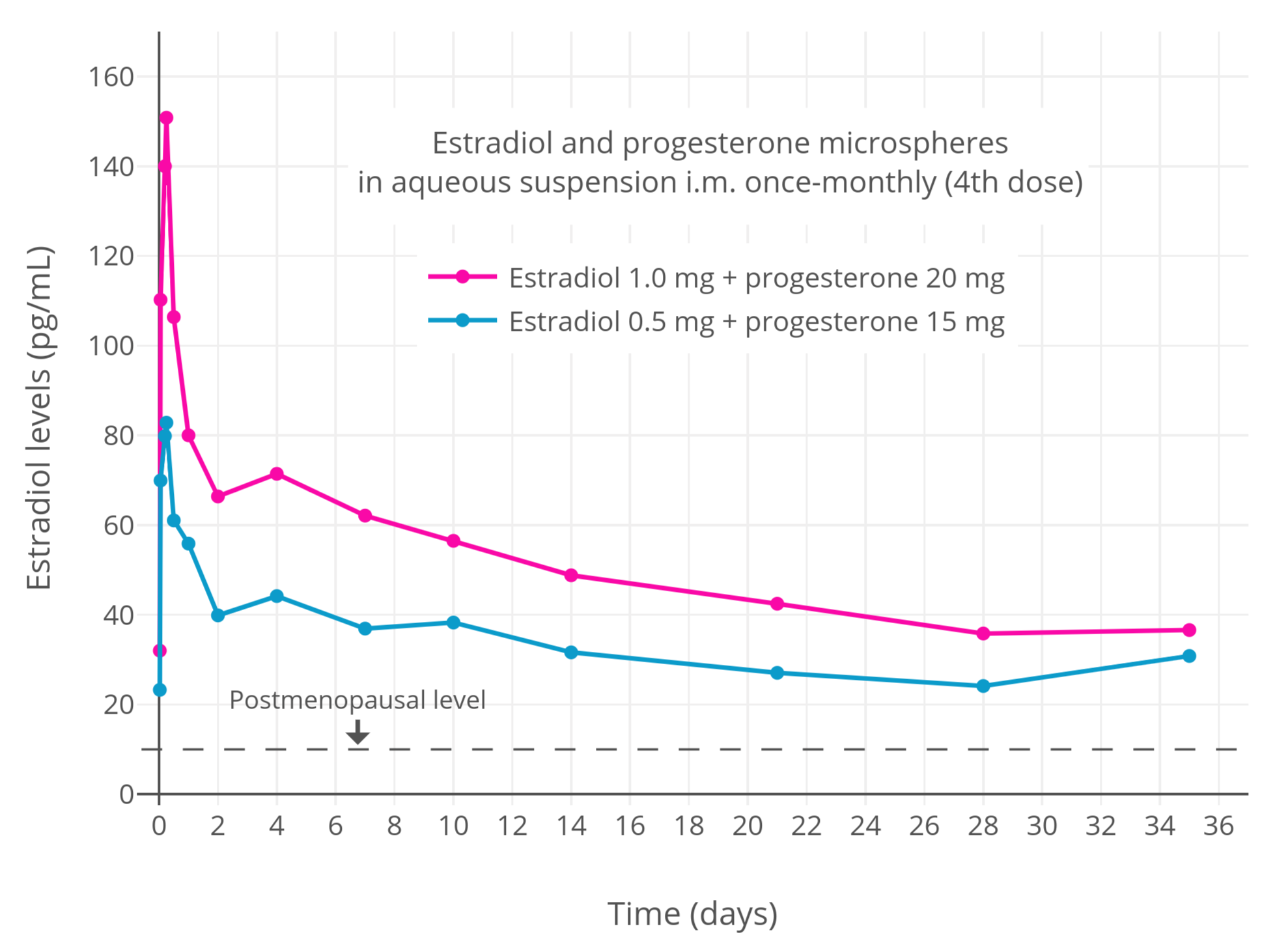
Estradiol levels after the fourth dose during continuous therapy with estradiol and progesterone microspheres in aqueous suspension by intramuscular injection once per month in menopausal women. Source: Espino y Sosa et al. (2019).
Note: See individual articles—estradiol valerate, cypionate, benzoate, dipropionate, enanthate, dienanthate, and undecylate, as well as polyestradiol phosphate—for more graphs.

=== Subcutaneous injection ===
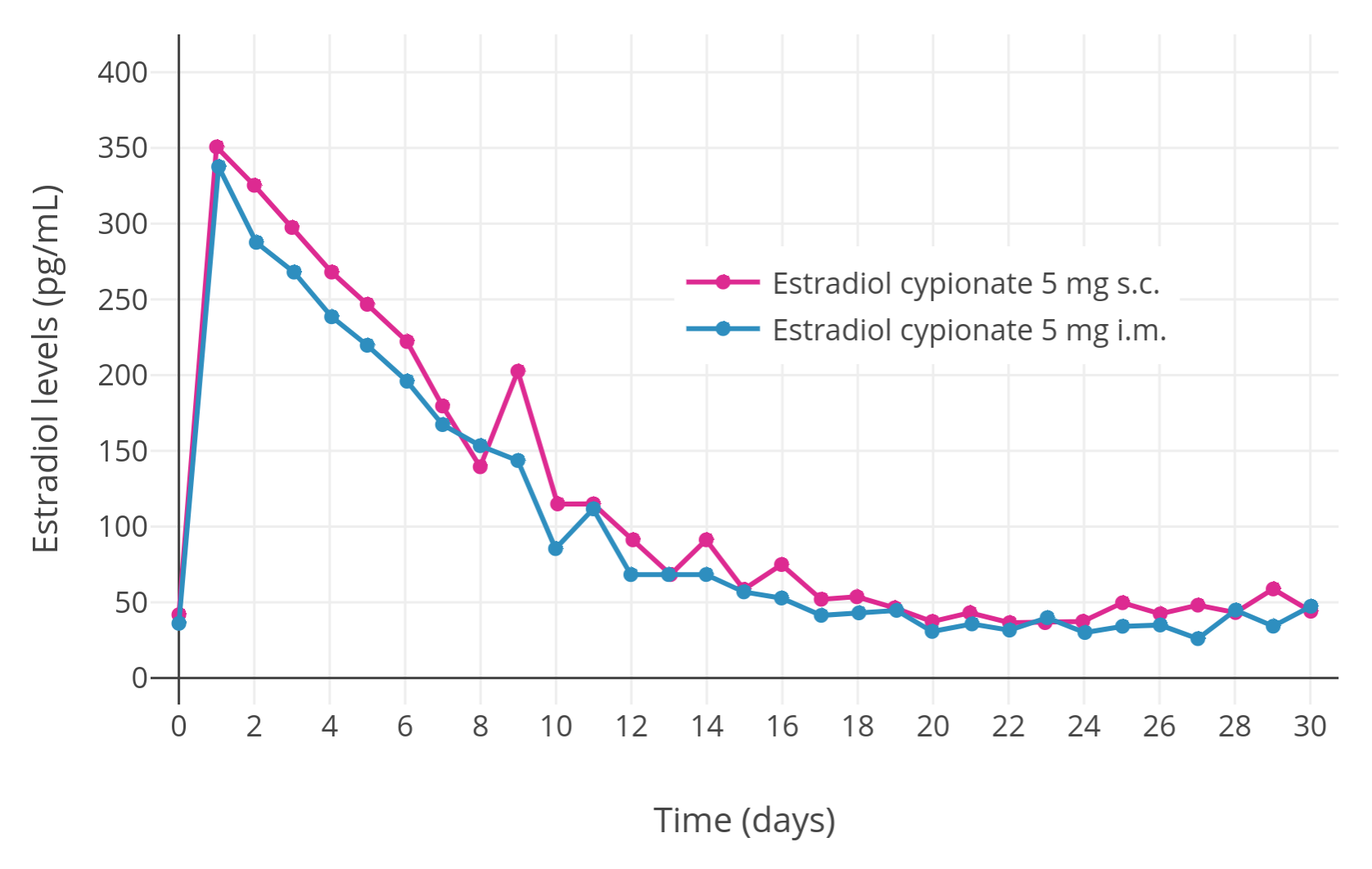
Estradiol levels after subcutaneous (s.c.) or intramuscular (i.m.) injection of 5 mg estradiol cypionate in aqueous suspension.

Estradiol esters like estradiol valerate and estradiol cypionate can be given by subcutaneous injection instead of intramuscular injection. Subcutaneous and intramuscular injection of estradiol cypionate in an aqueous suspension has been found to result in levels of estradiol and other pharmacokinetic parameters (e.g., duration) that were virtually identical. Studies have shown that subcutaneous injection of closely related steroid esters in oil like the androgen esters testosterone cypionate, testosterone enantate, and nandrolone decanoate is effective and has similar pharmacokinetics to intramuscular injection as well. In addition, studies have found that many intramuscular injections are really subcutaneous injections, as individuals often do not actually penetrate deep enough to inject into muscle when attempting to perform an intramuscular injection and instead inject into the subcutaneous fat layer above the muscle. This is particularly prevalent with injections into the buttocks and in overweight and obese individuals, due to the thicker layer of fat over muscle. Subcutaneous injections of estradiol esters may be easier and less painful to perform than intramuscular injections, and hence may result in improved compliance and satisfaction with therapy.

=== Subcutaneous implantation ===
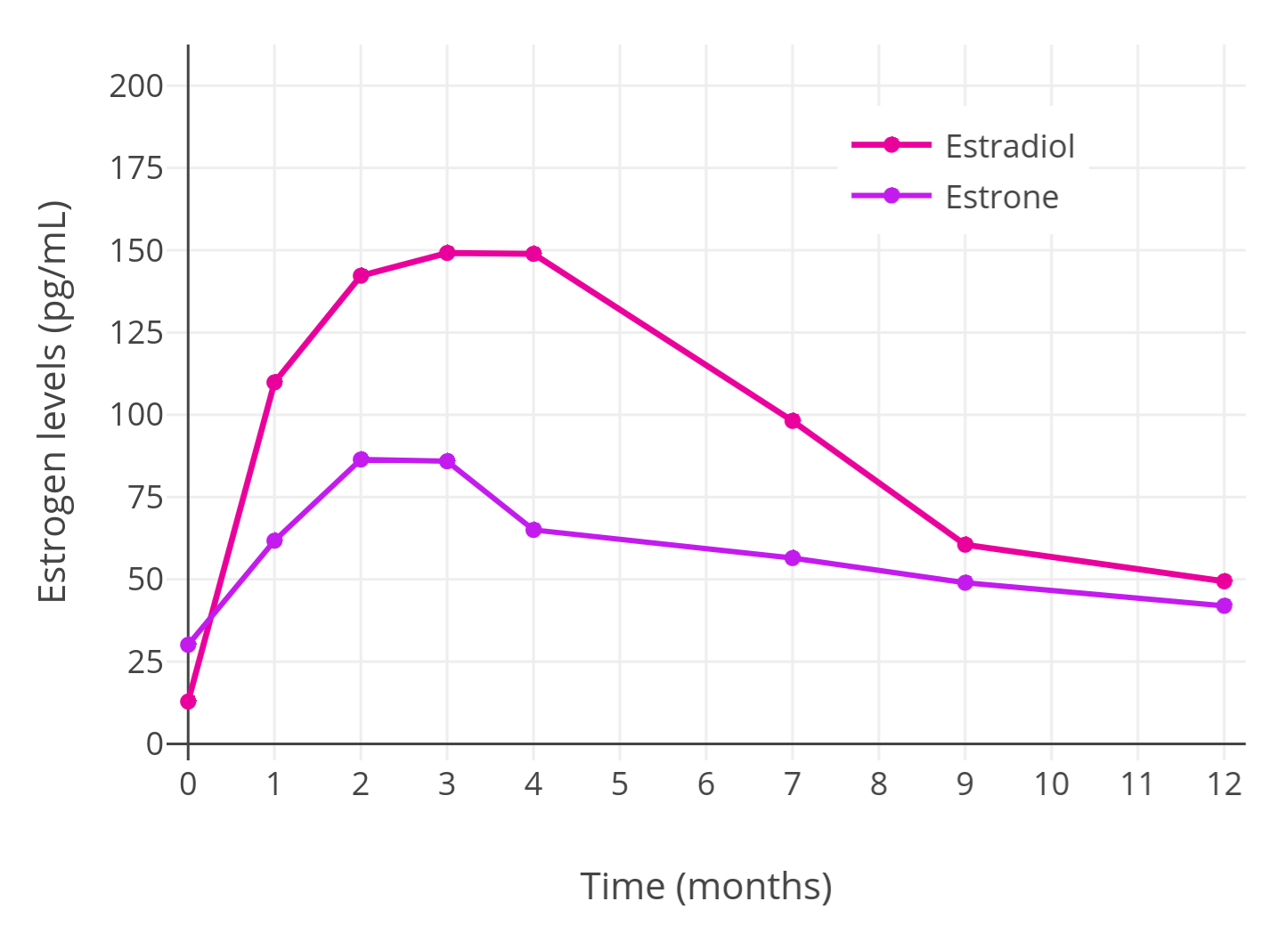
Levels of estradiol after surgical implantation of a subcutaneous pellet of 100 mg estradiol in women.

Estradiol can be administered in a very long-lasting form via subcutaneous implantation of pure crystalline estradiol compressed into a small solid cylindrical pellet. These pellets slowly and completely dissolve and are replaced once every 6 to 12 months, achieving high and very constant circulating levels of estradiol. They are surgically inserted with the aid of a trocar by a trained physician in a medical office or clinic, and can be placed into locations including the lower abdomen, lower back, buttocks, or hips. Subcutaneous pellets containing 20 mg estradiol (brand name Meno-Implant) or 25, 50, or 100 mg estradiol (brand name Estradiol Implants; discontinued) for replacement usually once every 6 months (range 4 to 8 months) are or have been available as approved pharmaceutical medications. Up to 800 mg estradiol per implantation has been used. Pharmaceutical estradiol pellet implants have been used almost exclusively in the United Kingdom, but have also been available in Australia and the Netherlands. However, estradiol pellets have been discontinued in both the United Kingdom and Australia. An estradiol implant has not been approved by the FDA as a pharmaceutical medication in the United States, but hormone pellet implants, including estradiol pellets, are available as custom compounded products in this country.

Estradiol pellet implants are advantageous in that some women seem to need higher levels of estradiol for adequate relief of menopausal symptoms, and subcutaneous estradiol pellets are easily able to achieve such levels. Conversely, this is not necessarily the case with oral or transdermal estradiol. Another major advantage of estradiol pellet implants is convenience and guaranteed compliance. They also do not have the issues pertaining to first-pass metabolism and liver protein synthesis of oral estradiol. A major disadvantage of estradiol pellet implants is that they cannot be easily removed should this be necessary. There are also concerns about accumulation of estradiol levels with long-term repeated pellet implantation. Estradiol levels may remain above baseline for a year or in some cases 3 to 4 years following the last pellet insertion. During this time, progestogen therapy should be continued to avoid the risk of endometrial changes. Regular monitoring of estradiol levels and adjustment of dosing is recommended during therapy with estradiol pellet implants.

Tachyphylaxis of relief of vasomotor symptoms, or hot flashes returning even with normal or supraphysiological estradiol levels, may occur in a small subset of cases with estradiol pellet implants. The reason for this is unknown, but has been hypothesized to be a paradoxical effect of the high levels of estradiol achieved and/or a result of receptor desensitization caused by the long-term gradually decreasing levels of estradiol. Such symptoms have been said to occur once estradiol levels begin to decrease, although there are also reports of such symptoms occurring 3 to 16 weeks (1 to 4 months) after pellet insertion, when estradiol levels should still be constant. Hot flashes have notably been reported in pregnant women, who have very high and constantly increasing levels of estradiol. When recurrence of hot flashes occurs with estradiol pellets, treated women often complain that their pellet has "run out". Such symptoms can be temporarily offset with the use of supplemental oral or transdermal estradiol.

Following insertion of an estradiol pellet, levels of estradiol rapidly increase, remain constant for about 4 months, and then gradually decrease. A 25 mg subcutaneous estradiol pellet has been found to result in average estradiol levels of 90 pg/mL for 6 months, while two 25 mg pellets (50 mg total) resulted in estradiol levels of 180 pg/mL after 24 hours and levels of 100 to 120 pg/mL for 6 months. Higher-dose pellets resulted in estradiol levels for 50 mg of 100 pg/mL, for 75 mg of 140 pg/mL, and for 100 mg of 150 pg/mL. Estradiol levels are generally 50% higher than those of estrone, for an estradiol-to-estrone ratio of 1.5:1. Very high levels of estradiol of between 400 and 1,000 pg/mL have been observed in a small subset of women treated with estradiol pellets and notably in those experiencing symptoms of tachyphylaxis.

Estradiol pellet implants have been studied in the treatment of prostate cancer in men.

=== Intrauterine administration ===
Intrauterine estradiol has been studied in the treatment of uterine hypoplasia in women.

=== Intravenous injection ===
The administration of estradiol by intravenous injection has been studied. It achieves extremely high peak levels of estradiol but has a very short duration. Kuhnz et al. (1993) reported that a single intravenous injection of 0.3 mg estradiol resulted in peak estradiol concentrations of 8,321 pg/mL at 5 minutes post-injection. Estradiol levels decreased to 1,628 pg/mL after 30 minutes, to 778 pg/mL after 1 hour, and to 23 pg/mL after 6 hours. Leyendecker et al. (1975) reported that a single intravenous injection of 20 mg estradiol resulted in estradiol levels of 2,950 pg/mL at 12 hours after the injection (earlier time points were not measured). Following this, estradiol levels decreased to around 400 pg/mL by 24 hours post-injection and reached near-baseline levels of 45 pg/mL after 48 hours. The ratio of estradiol to estrone is very high initially (e.g., around 10:1 at peak) but becomes smaller as estradiol levels decline. The distribution half-life of intravenous estradiol is about 6 minutes and the terminal half-life of intravenous estradiol is about 0.5 to 2 hours. The peak estradiol levels are far higher and the duration far shorter when estradiol is given by intravenous injection than when estradiol esters are administered by intramuscular or subcutaneous injection.

The administration of estradiol valerate by intravenous injection has been studied as well. It has been found to be very rapidly cleaved into estradiol in the blood. The metabolism of estradiol valerate does not differ with intravenous versus intramuscular injection.

While estradiol itself has not been used clinically by intravenous injection, certain estrogen preparations such as conjugated estrogens and estramustine phosphate are available in formulations indicated for intravenous injection. Both of these medications act in part as prodrugs of estradiol. The intravenous formulation of conjugated estrogens is available at a dose of 25 mg per injection and is used in the treatment of abnormal uterine bleeding due to its ability to rapidly and temporarily enhance coagulation. It has also been used off-label to treat severe bleeding after hysteroscopic metroplasty and as an emergency contraceptive. The formulation is given in a single injection but can be repeated after 6 to 12 hours if necessary. Intravenous estramustine phosphate has a relatively long duration and, like oral estramustine phosphate, is used in the treatment of prostate cancer. Estramustine phosphate was initially introduced as an intravenous formulation and was only later introduced as an oral medication. Following introduction of the more convenient oral formulation, intravenous estramustine phosphate has largely been abandoned.

The administration of large doses of estrogens intravenously has been studied.

Hormone levels with estradiol by intravenous administration
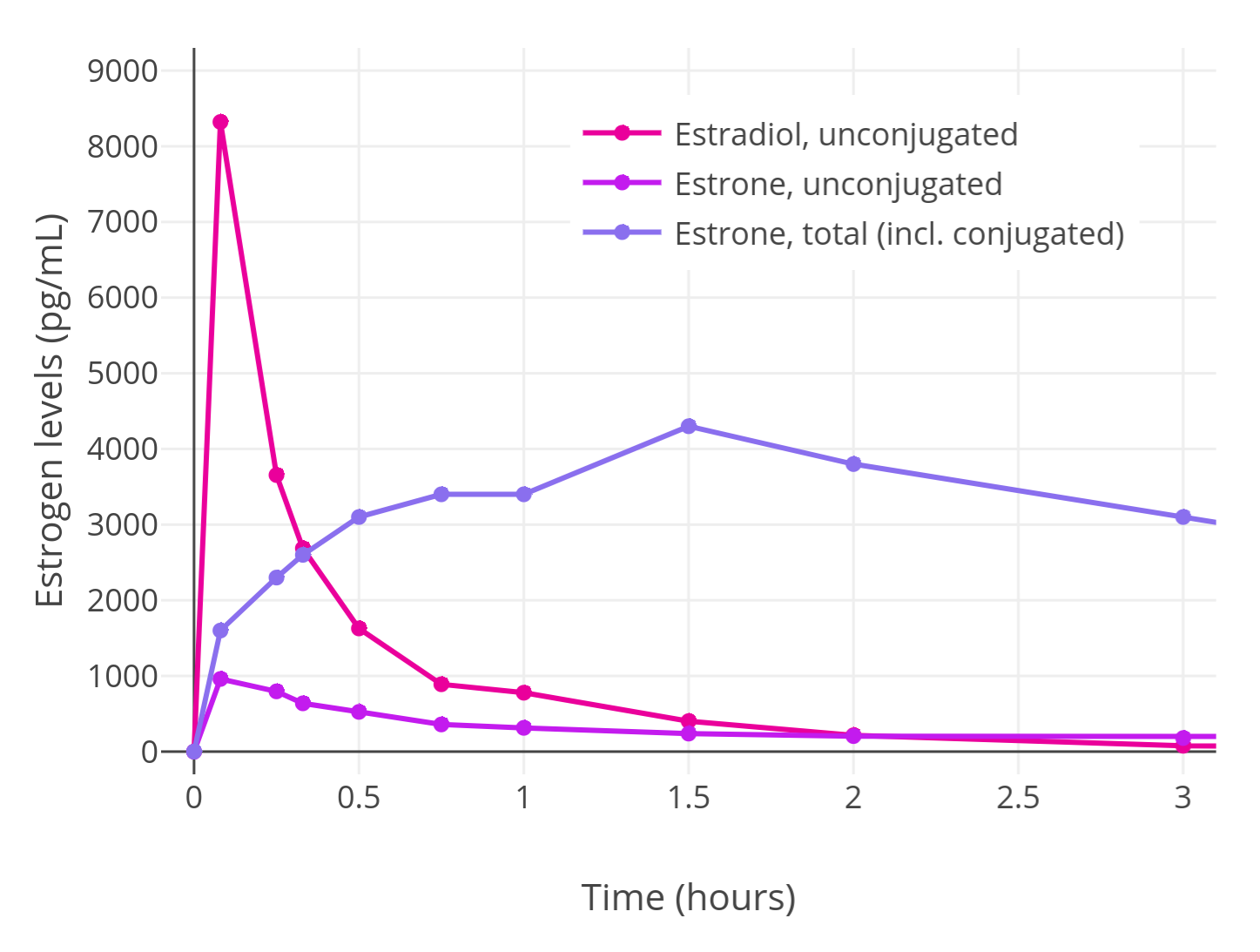
Baseline-corrected levels of estradiol, estrone, and estrone conjugates (e.g., estrone sulfate) after a single intravenous infusion of 0.3 mg estradiol in aqueous solution in women.

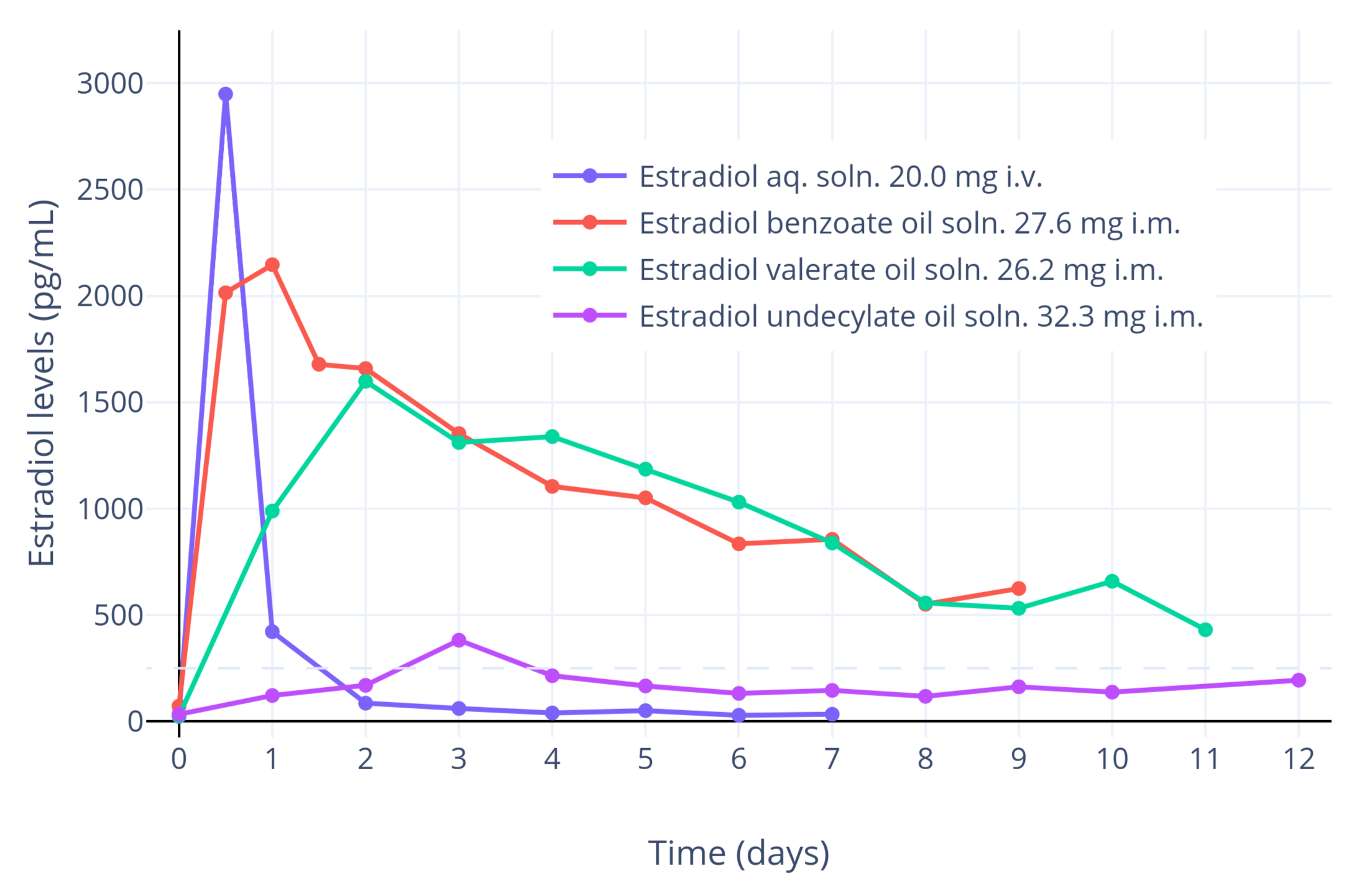
Estradiol levels after a short intravenous infusion of 20 mg estradiol in aqueous solution or an intramuscular injection of an equimolar dose of estradiol benzoate, estradiol valerate, or estradiol undecylate in oil solution in women. Earlier time points than 12 hours post-infusion for intravenous estradiol were not measured.

== General ==
=== Absorption ===
Estradiol is well-absorbed regardless of route of administration. However, the bioavailability of estradiol differs substantially with different routes of administration. Oral estradiol has an average bioavailability of around 5%, requiring relatively high dosages of estradiol for effects. Estradiol administered in the form of an ester by intramuscular or subcutaneous injection has complete bioavailability.

=== Distribution ===
Estradiol is rapidly distributed throughout the body, with a distribution phase of about 6 minutes following intravenous injection. Estradiol is taken up into cells via passive diffusion due to its lipophilicity. Due to binding to the ERs, estradiol is preferentially concentrated in tissues with the highest ER content. In animals, these tissues have included the uterus, vagina, mammary glands, pituitary gland, hypothalamus, other brain regions, adipose tissue, liver, and adrenal glands, among other tissues. In contrast to estradiol, due to its low affinities for the ERs, estrone is not accumulated in target tissues. Estradiol has been found to cross the blood–brain barrier in rhesus monkeys. The volume of distribution of estradiol has been found to be 0.85 to 1.17 L/kg. In another study however, its volume of distribution was only 0.082 ± 0.015 L/kg (4.8 L in women of average weight 58.4 kg).

In terms of plasma protein binding, estradiol is bound loosely to albumin and tightly to SHBG, with approximately 97 to 98% of estradiol bound to plasma proteins. In the circulation, approximately 38% of estradiol is bound to SHBG and 60% is bound to albumin, with 2 to 3% free or unbound. However, with oral estradiol, there is an increase in hepatic SHBG production and hence SHBG levels (e.g., +50%), and this results in a relatively reduced fraction of free estradiol. As only free estradiol that is not bound to plasma proteins or SHBG is biologically active, this may reduce the potency of oral estradiol by some degree. However, a study found that the free fraction of estradiol was similar with doses of oral and topical estradiol that resulted in equivalent total estradiol levels.

=== Metabolism ===
Metabolic pathways of estradiol in humans

Description: The metabolic pathways involved in the metabolism of estradiol and other natural estrogens (e.g., estrone, estriol) in humans. In addition to the metabolic transformations shown in the diagram, conjugation (e.g., sulfation and glucuronidation) occurs in the case of estradiol and metabolites of estradiol that have one or more available hydroxyl (–OH) groups. Sources: See template page.

There are several major pathways of estradiol metabolism, which occur both in the liver and in other tissues:

- Dehydrogenation by 17β-hydroxysteroid dehydrogenase (17β-HSD) into estrone
- Conjugation by estrogen sulfotransferases and UDP-glucuronyltransferases into C3 and/or C17β estrogen conjugates like estrone sulfate and estradiol glucuronide
- Hydroxylation by cytochrome P450 enzymes such as CYP1A1 and CYP3A4 into catechol estrogens like 2-hydroxyestrone and 2-hydroxyestradiol as well as 16-hydroxylated estrogens like 16α-hydroxyestrone and estriol (16α-hydroxyestradiol)

The liver is almost entirely responsible for metabolism of estradiol.

Both dehydrogenation of estradiol by 17β-HSD into estrone and conjugation into estrogen conjugates are reversible transformations. However, in regards to sulfation and desulfation, transformation of estrone into estrone sulfate is predominant relative to the reverse reaction.

Estradiol can also be reversibly converted into long-lived lipoidal estradiol forms like estradiol palmitate and estradiol stearate as a minor route of metabolism.

The elimination half-life of estradiol administered via intravenous injection has been found to be 2 hours in men and 27 to 50 minutes in women. Other routes of administration of estradiol like oral administration or intramuscular injection have far longer elimination half-lives and durations of action due to (1) the formation of a large circulating reservoir of metabolism-resistant estrogen conjugates that can be reconverted back into estradiol and/or (2) the formation of slowly-releasing depots.

The metabolic clearance rates of estradiol, estrone, and estrone sulfate are 580 L/day/m^{2}, 1,050 L/day/m^{2}, and 80 L/day/m^{2}, respectively.

=== Elimination ===
A single dose of oral estradiol valerate is eliminated 54% in urine and 6% in feces. A substantial amount of estradiol is also excreted in bile. The urinary metabolites of estradiol are predominantly present in the form of estrogen conjugates, including glucuronides and, to a lesser extent, sulfates. The main metabolites of estradiol in urine are estrone glucuronide (13–30%), 2-hydroxyestrone (2.6–10.1%), unchanged estradiol (5.2–7.5%), estriol (2.0–5.9%), and 16α-hydroxyestrone (1.0–2.9%). Following an intravenous injection of labeled estradiol in women, almost 90% is excreted in urine and feces within 4 to 5 days. Enterohepatic recirculation causes a delay in excretion of estradiol.

== See also ==
- Pharmacodynamics of estradiol
- Pharmacodynamics of progesterone
- Pharmacokinetics of progesterone
- Pharmacokinetics of testosterone
