= Side effects of bicalutamide =

Major side effects of bicalutamide
Frequency	Class of effect	Effect
Very common (≥10%)	Reproductive system and breast disorders	• Breast tenderness (Note: May occur as often as 90% of those taking bicalutamide, but is mild-to-moderate in 90% of occurrences. Incidence greatly decreased in combination with castration.) • Gynecomastia
Common (1–10%)	General and psychiatric disorders	• Asthenia • Decreased libido • Erectile dysfunction • Hot flashes
Common (1–10%)	Skin and subcutaneous tissue disorders	• Decreased body hair
Common (1–10%)	Hepato-biliary disorders	• Elevated liver enzymes (Note: Usually transient, rarely severe. Resolves or improves with continued therapy or on discontinuation.)
Uncommon (0.1–1%)	Immune system disorders and hypersensitivity reactions	• Angioedema • Hives
Rare (<0.1%) or unknown	Respiratory disorders	• Lung disease (Note: Reported in single cases, but not observed in any large, randomized trial. With regular liver monitoring and discontinuation as needed.)
Rare (<0.1%) or unknown	Skin and subcutaneous tissue disorders	• Sensitivity to light
Rare (<0.1%) or unknown	Hepato-biliary disorders	• Liver toxicity

The side effects of bicalutamide, a nonsteroidal antiandrogen (NSAA), including its frequent and rare side effects, have been well-studied and characterized. The most common side effects of bicalutamide monotherapy in men include breast tenderness, breast growth, feminization, demasculinization, and hot flashes. Less common side effects of bicalutamide monotherapy in men include sexual dysfunction, depression, fatigue, weakness, and anemia. Bicalutamide is well tolerated and has few side effects in women. General side effects of bicalutamide that may occur in either sex include diarrhea, constipation, abdominal pain, nausea, dry skin, itching, and rash.

In men with prostate cancer, bicalutamide monotherapy has been found to increase the likelihood of death due to causes other than prostate cancer. Bicalutamide has been found to cause unfavorable liver changes in around 3 to 11% of people, with such changes necessitating discontinuation in approximately 1%. Rarely, bicalutamide has been associated with serious liver toxicity and lung disease, as well as sensitivity to light. It has also uncommonly been associated with hypersensitivity reactions. Bicalutamide has a theoretical risk of birth defects in male fetuses.

== Central nervous system ==
=== Hot flashes ===
In the Early Prostate Cancer (EPC) clinical trial programme, at 7.4 years follow-up, the rate of hot flashes was 9.2% for bicalutamide monotherapy relative to 5.4% for placebo, which was regarded as relatively low. In the LAPC subgroup of the EPC trial, the rate of hot flashes with bicalutamide monotherapy was 13.1% (relative to 50.0% for castration).

=== Sexual dysfunction ===
Bicalutamide may cause sexual dysfunction, including decreased sex drive and erectile dysfunction. However, the rates of these side effects with bicalutamide monotherapy are very low. In the EPC trial, at 7.4 years follow-up, the rates of decreased libido and impotence were only 3.6% and 9.3% in the 150 mg/day bicalutamide monotherapy group relative to 1.2% and 6.5% for placebo, respectively. Similarly, in the trials of 150 mg/day bicalutamide monotherapy for advanced prostate cancer, fewer than 10% of men reported decreased sex drive or reduced erectile function as a side effect. About two-thirds of men in these trials, who had advanced prostate cancer and were of almost invariably advanced age, maintained sexual interest, while sexual function was slightly reduced by 18%. Most men experience sexual dysfunction only moderately or not at all with bicalutamide monotherapy, and the same is true during monotherapy with other NSAAs. Bicalutamide monotherapy at a dosage of 50 mg/day had no effect on nocturnal erections in men with prostate cancer. The preservation of sexual desire and function with NSAA monotherapy may be related to testosterone metabolites such as estradiol and the 3α-androstanediol maintaining these functions rather than the androgen receptor or to bicalutamide and other NSAAs possibly incompletely blocking the androgen receptor in the brain.

Similarly to in men, bicalutamide has been associated with minimal or no sexual dysfunction in women. A phase III clinical study of 50 mg/day bicalutamide in conjunction with a combined oral contraceptive in women with severe hirsutism due to polyendocrine metabolic ovarian syndrome (PMOS) carefully assessed the side effect of decreased libido and found that the incidence with bicalutamide did not differ from the control group. Minimal rates of reduced sex drive have also been associated with the related NSAA flutamide. These findings are in accordance with the fact that women with complete androgen insensitivity syndrome (CAIS) show normal sexual function in spite of complete loss of androgen receptor (AR) signaling. They are also in accordance with a variety of findings concerning testosterone levels and sexual function in premenopausal women, in which no change in parameters of sexual function, including libido, have been observed in association with increases or decreases in testosterone levels. It appears that testosterone levels within the normal physiological range are not importantly involved in sexual desire or function in women.

=== Psychiatric conditions ===
At 5.3 years follow-up, the incidence of depression was 5.5% for bicalutamide monotherapy relative to 3.0% for placebo in the EPC trial, and the incidence of asthenia (weakness or fatigue) was 10.2% for bicalutamide monotherapy relative to 5.1% for placebo. Rarely, bicalutamide has been associated with hallucinations. This is thought to be secondary to AR antagonism.

== Breasts and reproductive system ==
Bicalutamide monotherapy and breast side effects in dose-ranging studies in men
Study	N	Dosage	Gynecomastia	Breast tenderness	Ref
Tyrrell et al. (1998)^{a}	386	10 mg/day	9%	11%	
Tyrrell et al. (1998)^{a}	386	30 mg/day	26%	42%	
Tyrrell et al. (1998)^{a}	386	50 mg/day	36%	48%	
Tyrrell et al. (1998)^{a}	386	100 mg/day	79%	86%	
Tyrrell et al. (1998)^{a}	386	150 mg/day	78%	89%	
Tyrrell et al. (1998)^{a}	386	200 mg/day	79%	79%	
Kennealey & Furr (1991)^{b}	210	10 mg/day	29%	38%	
Kennealey & Furr (1991)^{b}	210	30 mg/day	60%	64%	
Kennealey & Furr (1991)^{b}	210	50 mg/day	52%	60%	
Zanardi et al. (2006)^{c}	66	0 mg/week (controls)	0%	0%	
Zanardi et al. (2006)^{c}	66	50 mg/week (~7 mg/day)	44%	32%	
Zanardi et al. (2006)^{c}	66	100 mg/week (~14 mg/day)	50%	64%	
Footnotes: ^{a} = Testosterone levels increased to ~460–610 ng/dL and estradiol levels to ~32–51 pg/mL. ^{b} = Testosterone levels increased to ~505–715 ng/dL and estradiol levels to ~32–53 pg/mL. ^{c} = Testosterone levels increased to ~540–600 ng/dL and estradiol levels to ~29–34 pg/mL.

=== Breast changes ===
Gynecomastia in a 60-year-old man treated with 150 mg/day bicalutamide for prostate cancer.

The most common side effects of bicalutamide monotherapy in men are breast pain/tenderness and gynecomastia. These side effects may occur in as many as 90% of men treated with bicalutamide monotherapy, but gynecomastia is generally reported to occur in 70 to 80% of patients. In the EPC trial, at a median follow-up of 7.4 years, breast pain and gynecomastia respectively occurred in 73.6% and 68.8% of men treated with 150 mg/day bicalutamide monotherapy.

Rates of gynecomastia with bicalutamide monotherapy and monotherapy with other NSAA varies significantly across different trials, in reviews ranging from 38 to 85% with bicalutamide, 21 to 80% with flutamide, and 50 to 79% with nilutamide. This variation is presumably related to factors like duration of therapy, differing patient characteristics, and the specific methods of collection of adverse-event data. One review noted that rates of breast side effects were much lower with open questioning (23–26% for gynecomastia and 26–31% for breast tenderness at 50–150 mg/day bicalutamide) as opposed to direct questioning in studies of bicalutamide monotherapy for prostate cancer.

Gynecomastia associated with NSAA monotherapy usually develops within the first 6 to 9 months following initiation of treatment. In one study, 89% of those who developed gynecomastia and 98% of those who developed breast pain did so within the first 6 months. Of those who developed gynecomastia, around 55% did so in the first 3 months, around 35% between 3 and 6 months, and 10% after more than 6 months. For breast pain, rates were around 75% in the first 3 months, 25% between 3 and 6 months, and less than 5% after more than 6 months. In the EPC programme, 85% who developed breast pain did so in the first 6 months and 80% who developed gynecomastia did so in the first 9 months.

In more than 90% of affected men, bicalutamide-related breast changes are mild-to-moderate in severity. It is only rarely and in severe and extreme cases of gynecomastia that the proportions of the male breasts become so marked that they are comparable to those of women. In addition, bicalutamide-associated breast changes improve or resolve in most men upon discontinuation of therapy. In the EPC trial, 16.8% of bicalutamide patients relative to 0.7% of controls withdrew from the study due to breast pain and/or gynecomastia. Gynecomastia and breast pain improved or resolved upon discontinuation in 70 and 90% of patients, respectively. Resolution of breast symptoms was dependent on duration of bicalutamide therapy, with resolution rates ranging from 29% with >18 months of treatment to 64% for <6 months of treatment.

Gynecomastia and breast pain/tenderness with NSAA monotherapy is due to increased estradiol levels and unopposed estrogen action in the breasts due to androgen receptor blockade (as androgens inhibit the effects of estrogens in the breasts).

The incidence and severity of gynecomastia are reportedly slightly higher with estrogens (e.g., diethylstilbestrol) (40–80%) than with NSAAs like bicalutamide (40–70%) in the treatment of men with prostate cancer.

==== Management of breast changes ====
Severe gynecomastia with 150 mg/day bicalutamide monotherapy in a 64-year-old man with prostate cancer. Before (left) and after (right) surgical breast reduction.

Tamoxifen, a selective estrogen receptor modulator (SERM) with antiestrogenic actions in breast tissue and estrogenic actions in bone, has been found to be highly effective in preventing and reversing bicalutamide-induced gynecomastia in men. Moreover, in contrast to GnRH analogues (which also alleviate bicalutamide-induced gynecomastia), tamoxifen poses minimal risk of accelerated bone loss and osteoporosis. For reasons that are unclear, anastrozole, an aromatase inhibitor (or an inhibitor of estrogen biosynthesis), has been found to be much less effective in comparison to tamoxifen for treating bicalutamide-induced gynecomastia. A 2015 systematic review of NSAA-induced gynecomastia and breast tenderness concluded that tamoxifen (10–20 mg/day) and radiotherapy could effectively manage the side effect without relevant adverse effects, though with tamoxifen showing superior effectiveness. A 2019 network meta-analysis likewise concluded that tamoxifen was more effective than radiotherapy or anastrozole for preventing bicalutamide-induced gynecomastia. Surgical breast reduction may also be employed to correct bicalutamide-induced gynecomastia.

Tamoxifen doses and rates of bicalutamide-induced breast symptoms in men
Follow-up timepoint	Tamoxifen dosage					
Follow-up timepoint	Placebo	1 mg/day	2.5 mg/day	5 mg/day	10 mg/day	20 mg/day
0 months	–					
6 months	98%	90%	80%	54%	22%	10%
12 months	99%	95%	84%	56%	38%	19%
Notes: Prevention of breast symptoms—specifically gynecomastia and breast pain—induced by 150 mg/day bicalutamide monotherapy with tamoxifen in 282 men with prostate cancer. Bicalutamide and tamoxifen were initiated at the same time (0 months). Estradiol levels were in the range of about 22 to 47 pg/mL in the treated group. Sources:

==== Male breast cancer ====
A case report of male breast cancer subsequent to bicalutamide-induced gynecomastia has been published. According to the authors, "this is the second confirmed case of breast cancer in association with bicalutamide-induced gynaecomastia (correspondence AstraZeneca)." It is notable, however, that gynecomastia does not seem to increase the risk of breast cancer in men. Moreover, the lifetime incidence of breast cancer in men is approximately 0.1%, the average age of diagnosis of prostate cancer and male breast cancer are similar (around 70 years), and millions of men have been treated with bicalutamide for prostate cancer, all of which are potentially in support of the notion of chance co-occurrences. In accordance, the authors concluded that "causality cannot be established" and that it was "probable that the association is entirely coincidental and sporadic."

=== Lower reproductive system ===
Bicalutamide reduces the size of the prostate gland and seminal vesicles, though not of the testes. Slightly but significantly reduced penile length is also a recognized adverse effect of ADT. Reversible hypospermia or aspermia (that is, reduced or absent semen/ejaculate production) may occur. However, bicalutamide does not appear to adversely affect spermatogenesis, and thus may not necessarily abolish the capacity/potential for fertility in men. Due to the induction of chronic overproduction of LH and testosterone, there was concern that long-term bicalutamide monotherapy might induce Leydig cell hyperplasia and tumors (usually benign), but clinical studies indicate that Leydig cell hyperplasia does not occur to a clinically important extent.

==== Male birth defects ====
Because bicalutamide blocks the AR, like all antiandrogens, it can interfere with the androgen-mediated sexual differentiation of the genitalia (and brain) during prenatal development. In pregnant rats given bicalutamide at a dosage of 10 mg/kg/day (resulting in circulating drug levels approximately equivalent to two-thirds of human therapeutic concentrations) and above, feminization of male offspring, such as reduced anogenital distance and hypospadias, as well as impotence, were observed. No other teratogenic effects were observed in rats or rabbits receiving up to very high dosages of bicalutamide (that corresponded to up to approximately two times human therapeutic levels), and no teratogenic effects of any sort were observed in female rat offspring at any dosage. As such, bicalutamide is a selective reproductive teratogen in males, and may have the potential to produce undervirilization/sexually ambiguous genitalia in male fetuses. Due to its teratogenic capacity, contraception should be used in women taking bicalutamide who are fertile and sexually active.

== Skin, fat, and bone ==
=== Skin changes ===
Antiandrogen therapy and estrogen therapy are known to produce demasculinizing and feminizing effects in the skin and on hair follicle distribution in people assigned male at birth. Androgens are involved in regulation of the skin (e.g., sebum production), and antiandrogens are known to be associated with skin changes. Skin-related side effects, which included dry skin, itching, and rash, were reported at a rate of 2% in both monotherapy and CAB clinical studies of bicalutamide in men.

==== Sensitivity to light ====
A few cases of photosensitivity (hypersensitivity to ultraviolet light-induced skin redness and/or lesions) associated with bicalutamide have been reported. In one of the cases, bicalutamide was continued due to effectiveness in treating prostate cancer in the patient, and in combination with strict photoprotection (in the form of avoidance/prevention of ultraviolet light exposure). Eventually, the symptoms disappeared and did not recur. Flutamide is also associated with photosensitivity, but much more frequently in comparison to bicalutamide.

=== Fat distribution ===
Antiandrogen therapy and estrogen therapy are known to produce demasculinizing and feminizing effects on fat distribution in people assigned male at birth.

=== Bone density and fractures ===
Bicalutamide monotherapy preserves bone mineral density in men with prostate cancer relative to surgical or medical castration. This is considered to be due to preservation of gonadal estradiol production with bicalutamide monotherapy, in contrast to castration which greatly reduces estradiol levels. The risk of osteoporosis and serious bone fractures with bicalutamide monotherapy appears to be no different than with non-use in men with prostate cancer.

== Gastrointestinal system ==
The incidence of diarrhea with bicalutamide monotherapy in the EPC trial was comparable to placebo (6.3% vs. 6.4%, respectively). In phase III studies of bicalutamide monotherapy for LAPC, the rates of diarrhea for bicalutamide and castration were 6.4% and 12.5%, respectively, the rates of constipation were 13.7% and 14.4%, respectively, and the rates of abdominal pain were 10.5% and 5.6%, respectively.

== Heart, liver, kidneys, and lungs ==
=== Cardiovascular system ===
A study of high-dose bicalutamide monotherapy (300–600 mg/day) in 248 men with LAPC or metastatic prostate cancer found that there were no effects of bicalutamide on heart rate, blood pressure, or electrocardiogram parameters. At the 5-year follow-up of the study, the incidence of cardiovascular events was low, with no differences between the bicalutamide group and the castration group. There were also no differences in the incidences of arrhythmia, myocardial infarction, or other ischemic cardiac or cerebrovascular conditions.

In the LPC group of the EPC study, which compared 150 mg/day bicalutamide monotherapy versus placebo/standard care, there were numerically more deaths from heart failure (1.2% vs. 0.6%; 49 vs. 25 patients) in the bicalutamide group. This contributed to a trend toward significantly increased mortality due to causes other than prostate cancer in the bicalutamide group. Cardiovascular morbidity, on the other hand, was similar between the bicalutamide and placebo groups. In the NRG/RTOG 9601 trial, bicalutamide monotherapy significantly increased the risk of grade 3 to 5 cardiovascular incidents after a median 13 years of follow-up.

A systematic review and meta-analysis of randomized controlled trials of ADT and risk of cardiovascular death in men with non-metastatic prostate cancer was published in 2011. It assessed ADT in the form of a GnRH agonist or surgical castration alone or in combination with a NSAA and included over 4,000 patients. The meta-analysis found no evidence of increased cardiovascular mortality or overall mortality. Non-prostate cancer mortality was not specifically assessed. A limitation of the meta-analysis was that of the trials included in the meta-analysis, only flutamide was employed and not bicalutamide. Subsequent reviews and meta-analyses, published between 2014 and 2022, have reported positive though inconsistent associations of ADT with cardiovascular complications and death.

A case report in which bicalutamide was described as a probable cause of heart failure in a man with prostate cancer has been published.

==== Lipid profile ====
Bicalutamide has been found to increase total cholesterol and LDL cholesterol levels in women with polyendocrine metabolic ovarian syndrome (PMOS) and hirsutism taking a combined birth control pill. There was also a non-significant trend toward increased triglyceride levels. Lipid changes with bicalutamide in men with prostate diseases have also been studied, but no significant changes have been found in studies in this population. Heightened LDL cholesterol and triglyceride levels are potential risk factors for atherosclerosis or coronary heart disease. Unfavorable blood lipid profile changes have also been seen with other antiandrogens in women, for instance cyproterone acetate and spironolactone, and with androgenic medications.

==== Coagulation ====
NSAA monotherapy is associated with a greater risk of venous thromboembolism (VTE) than non-use, although not to the same extent as surgical or medical castration or particularly high-dose estrogen therapy.

=== Kidney function ===
Androgens and anabolic steroids, including testosterone, have trophic and anabolic effects in the kidneys. Androgen deprivation therapy, including with GnRH agonists and bicalutamide monotherapy, may increase the risk of kidney failure in men. A large randomized controlled trial in men with prostate cancer found that the incidence of kidney failure was 1 to 2% in men treated with combined androgen blockade using bicalutamide or flutamide, although this study had no placebo group. Several preclinical studies are suggestive that bicalutamide may have toxic effects on kidney cells. This may be secondary to androgen deprivation. Kidney toxicity with bicalutamide and ADT has yet to be fully assessed clinically.

==== Anemia ====
Androgens including testosterone are known to stimulate erythropoiesis (formation of red blood cells) and increase hematocrit (red blood cell levels). These effects are mediated by increasing production and secretion of erythropoietin from the kidneys. Erythropoietin in turn stimulates erythropoiesis in hematopoietic tissues such as bone marrow. The high levels of testosterone in males are why hematocrit and hemoglobin levels are higher in men than in women. Due to stimulation of erythropoiesis, anabolic–androgenic steroids (AAS) such as oxymetholone and nandrolone decanoate are effective for and used in the treatment of severe anemia (very low hematocrit). High doses or levels of AAS, including testosterone, can cause polycythemia—high red blood cell and/or hemoglobin levels that increase the risk of stroke—as an adverse effect. Conversely, whether via castration, NSAA monotherapy, or CAB, decreased erythropoiesis resulting in mild anemia is a common side effect of ADT in men. The incidence of anemia with bicalutamide either as a monotherapy or with castration was about 7.3 to 7.5% in clinical trials, which was similar to the rate with castration of about 7.1%. A decrease of hemoglobin levels of 1 to 2 g/dL after about 6 months of treatment may be observed.

Greater decreases in hemoglobin levels and anemia incidences have been reported with flutamide relative to bicalutamide (e.g., 9.8% anemia rate with flutamide plus a GnRH agonist). Flutamide has been associated with cases of hemolytic anemia, macrocytic anemia, methemoglobinemia, sulfhemoglobinemia, leukopenia, neutropenia, and thrombocytopenia, whereas such complications may not be associated with bicalutamide.

=== Liver toxicity ===
Although rare, bicalutamide can be hepatotoxic (toxic to the liver). Symptoms may include elevated transaminases, jaundice, hepatitis, and liver failure. In the EPC trial, in which bicalutamide monotherapy (150 mg/day) was evaluated for treatment of early prostate cancer in 8,113 men, the incidence of abnormal liver function tests at 3-year median follow-up was 3.4% for bicalutamide plus standard care (n=4,052) and 1.9% for standard care alone (n=4,061). However, in a phase 3 clinical trial of bicalutamide (50 mg/day) plus a GnRH agonist versus flutamide (750 mg/day) plus a GnRH agonist for metastatic prostate cancer, the rate of abnormal liver function tests was 7.5% with bicalutamide (n=401) and 11.3% with flutamide (n=407). Markedly elevated liver enzymes occurred at rates of 0.5% with bicalutamide and 2.5% with flutamide in this trial, whereas rates of drug discontinuation due to elevated liver enzymes were 1.5% with bicalutamide and 2.0% with flutamide. In clinical trials, bicalutamide-induced liver changes have usually been transient and have rarely been severe. Bicalutamide was discontinued due to liver changes (manifested as hepatitis or marked increases in liver enzymes) in clinical trials in 0.3% to 1.5% of patients, or approximately 1% overall. Aside from men with prostate cancer, liver changes have also been observed in women treated with low doses of bicalutamide (10–50 mg/day) for scalp hair loss. Rates of elevated liver enzymes have ranged from 2.9 to 11.4% in these studies, which spontaneously resolved in some women and necessitated discontinuation of treatment in others.

No cases of liver failure or death due to liver toxicity were seen with bicalutamide in the initial clinical development programme for prostate cancer which included over 3,900 men treated with bicalutamide. These trials employed bicalutamide alone (as a monotherapy) and in combination with castration at doses ranging from 10 to 450 mg/day (with most patients receiving 50 to 150 mg/day). Five cases of jaundice, including one man who died of prostate cancer, chronic renal failure, and jaundice, were recorded in the programme. Rates of jaundice with bicalutamide in the programme were similar to comparator therapies. No instances of fatal hepatotoxicity occurred with 150 mg/day bicalutamide monotherapy in the SPCG-6 substudy of the EPC programme, in which 607 men received bicalutamide. Following the initial clinical development programme of bicalutamide for prostate cancer and the EPC programme, cases of grade 3 to 4 (severe or life-threatening/disabling) adverse liver changes have been reported with bicalutamide in subsequent individual trials of bicalutamide for treatment of various types of cancer.

The risk of liver changes with bicalutamide is considered to be small but significant, and monitoring of liver function is recommended. Elevation of transaminases above twice the normal range or jaundice may be an indication that bicalutamide should be discontinued. Liver changes with bicalutamide usually occur within the first 3 to 6 months of treatment, and it is recommended that liver function be monitored regularly for the first 4 months of treatment and periodically thereafter. Symptoms that may indicate liver dysfunction include nausea, vomiting, abdominal pain, fatigue, anorexia, "flu-like" symptoms, dark urine, and jaundice.

As of 2022, at least 10 case reports of bicalutamide-associated hepatotoxicity or liver failure, two of which were fatal, have been published in the literature. The dosages of bicalutamide in the cases ranged from 50 to 150 mg/day and the onsets were all within 6 months of therapy. One of the cases onset after only two doses of bicalutamide and may have been more related to prolonged prior exposure to flutamide and CPA. Aside from published case reports, hundreds of additional cases of liver complications in people taking bicalutamide exist in the FDA Adverse Event Reporting System (FAERS) database. Similarly, additional cases exist in and have been described in published research for other pharmacovigilance systems, such as the Spanish pharmacovigilance system.

Liver toxicity is considered to be much more rare with bicalutamide than with flutamide, and bicalutamide is also regarded as having a lower risk than nilutamide. Rates of abnormal liver function tests have varied widely between studies, with reported ranges of 4 to 62% with flutamide and 2 to 33% with nilutamide. The risk of serious or fatal liver toxicity with flutamide has been estimated to be 3 in 10,000 cases, and other studies suggest an even higher incidence. By 1996, 46 cases of severe cholestatic hepatitis associated with flutamide had been reported, with 20 of the cases resulting in death. A 2002 review reported that there were 18 reports of hepatotoxicity associated with CPA in the medical literature, with 6 of the reported cases resulting in death. The review also cited a report of an additional 96 instances of hepatotoxicity that were attributed to CPA, of which 33 resulted in death. However, clinically significant liver toxicity has almost exclusively been associated with high doses of CPA in men with prostate cancer (≥100 mg/day).

There is no evidence of greater liver function changes with higher doses of bicalutamide, and hence the liver toxicity of bicalutamide is not currently known to be dose-dependent across its clinically used dosage range. Older age, for a variety of reasons, appears to be an important risk factor for drug-induced hepatotoxicity. As such, the risk of liver changes with bicalutamide may be lower in younger individuals, for instance women with hirsutism and transgender women. However, it has been reported on the basis of very limited evidence that this may not be the case with flutamide.

From a theoretical standpoint (on the basis of structure–activity relationships), it has been suggested that flutamide, bicalutamide, and nilutamide, to varying extents, all have the potential to cause liver toxicity. However, in contrast to flutamide, hydroxyflutamide, and nilutamide, bicalutamide exhibits less or no mitochondrial toxicity and inhibition of enzymes in the electron transport chain such as respiratory complex I (NADH ubiquinone oxidoreductase), and this may be the reason for its lower risk of hepatotoxicity in comparison. The activity difference may be related to the fact that flutamide, hydroxyflutamide, and nilutamide all possess a nitroaromatic group, whereas in bicalutamide, a cyano group is present in place of this nitro group, potentially reducing toxicity. A potential biological target mediating hepatotoxicity with antiandrogens, such as flutamide and cyproterone acetate, is the aryl hydrocarbon receptor.

Published case reports of bicalutamide-associated liver injury
#	Age	Sex	Dosage	Use	Onset	Outcome	Source
1	60 years	Male	50 mg/day	Prostate cancer	2 days	Survived	Dawson et al. (1997)
2	79 years	Male	80 mg/day	Prostate cancer	1.5 months	Survived	Ikemoto et al. (2000)
3	59 years	Male	50 mg/day	Prostate cancer	4 days	Death	O'Bryant et al. (2008)
4	61 years	Male	50 mg/day	Prostate cancer	3.5 months	Death	Castro Beza et al. (2008)
5	81 years	Male	150 mg/day	Prostate cancer	3 weeks	Survived	Hussain et al. (2014)
6	62 years	Male	100 mg/day	Prostate cancer	4.5 months	Survived	Yun et al. (2016)
7	67 years	Male	150 mg/day	Prostate cancer	3 weeks	Survived	Gretarsdottir et al. (2018)
8	79 years	Male	Unknown	Prostate cancer	15 days	Survived	Saito (2020)
9	17 years	Trans female	50 mg/day	Gender-affirming hormone therapy	3 months	Survived	Wilde et al. (2023)
Notes: Additional cases of bicalutamide-associated adverse liver changes have been reported. These include 11 cases in a 2006 Spanish pharmacovigilance system report (including 1 case of hepatitis, 2 cases of cholestatic hepatitis, 1 case of jaundice, 4 cases of elevated liver enzymes, and 1 case of elevated bilirubin; no deaths) and a number of cases in the FDA Adverse Event Reporting System (FAERS). Also 5 cases of jaundice were reported out of ~3,700 men in clinical trials but no cases of liver failure or of liver-toxicity-related death clearly attributable to bicalutamide were observed. Sources: Main:

=== Lung toxicity ===
Case reports of interstitial pneumonitis associated with bicalutamide treatment have been published in the medical literature. Hundreds of additional cases of interstitial lung disease in people taking bicalutamide exist in the FDA Adverse Event Reporting System (FAERS) database. Interstitial pneumonitis can progress to pulmonary fibrosis and can be fatal. Interstitial pneumonitis with bicalutamide is said to be a very rare event. The risk is much lower than that with nilutamide (which has an incidence rate of 0.5–2% of patients). In a large cohort of prostate cancer patients, the incidence of interstitial pneumonitis with NSAAs was 0.77% for nilutamide, 0.04% (4 per 10,000) for flutamide, and 0.01% (1 per 10,000) for bicalutamide. An assessment done prior to the publication of the aforementioned study estimated the rates of pulmonary toxicity with flutamide, bicalutamide, and nilutamide as 1 case, 5 cases, and 303 cases per million, respectively. Strong safety signals of bicalutamide with interstitial lung disease have been observed in pharmacovigilance databases such as the FAERS and Japanese Adverse Drug Event Report (JADER) databases (e.g., ROR = 9.2, 95% CI = 7.9–10.6; ROR = 8.2, 95% CI = 6.0–11.2). Similar safety signals have been observed for certain other antiandrogens, like nilutamide and flutamide. In addition to interstitial pneumonitis, there is a smaller number of published case reports of eosinophilic lung disease associated with bicalutamide. Side effects associated with the rare lung toxicity of bicalutamide may include dyspnea (difficult breathing or shortness of breath), cough, and pharyngitis (inflammation of the pharynx, resulting in sore throat).

Published case reports of bicalutamide-associated lung toxicity
#	Age	Sex	Dosage	Onset	Type of injury	Outcome	Ref
1	69 years	Male	200 mg/day	6 months	Eosinophilic lung disease	Recovered	Wong et al. (1998)
2	~76 years	Male	200 mg/day	8 months	Interstitial pneumonitis	Recovered	McCaffrey & Scher (1998)
3	~82 years	Male	80 mg/day	4 weeks	Interstitial pneumonitis	Recovered	Shioi et al. (2003)
4	~72 years	Male	80 mg/day	2.5 months	Interstitial pneumonitis	Recovered, then death^{a}	Shioi et al. (2005)
5	84 years	Male	?	8 months	Interstitial pneumonitis	Recovered	Kobayashi et al. (2006)
6	76 years	Male	?	?	Interstitial pneumonitis	?	Gifford & DeLong (2008)
7	85 years	Male	?	4 months	Interstitial pneumonitis	Death	Kawahara et al. (2009)
8	78 years	Male	80 mg/day	8 months	Interstitial pneumonitis	Recovered	Masago et al. (2011)
9	77 years	Male	?	7 months	Interstitial pneumonitis	Death	Song et al. (2014)
10	77 years	Male	>50 mg/day	~12 months	Interstitial pneumonitis	Death	Molina Mancero et al. (2016)
11	79 years	Male	?	1 month	Interstitial pneumonitis	Death	Polatoglu et al. (2017)
12	66 years	Male	?	?	Interstitial pneumonitis	Recovered	Kim et al. (2018)
13	66 years	Male	?	?	Interstitial pneumonitis	Recovered	Derichs et al. (2018)
14	86 years	Male	150 mg/day	6 years	Eosinophilic pneumonitis	Recovered	Umeojiako & James (2019)
15	75 years	Male	?	2 weeks	Interstitial pneumonitis	Death	Maeda et al. (2019)
16	79 years	Male	?	1.5 months	Interstitial pneumonitis	Recovered	Saito (2020)
17	66 years	Male	50 mg/day	6 months	Interstitial pneumonitis	Recovered	Smith & Antonarakis (2020)
Footnotes: ^{a} = Died of pneumothorax followed by spontaneous rupture of bulla induced by previous interstitial pneumonitis 14 months after discontinuation of bicalutamide and recovery from interstitial pneumonitis. Notes: Twelve additional cases of bicalutamide-associated interstitial pneumonitis, three of which resulted in death, were observed in an 87,000-patient cohort from MedWatch (U.S. FDA passive adverse-event reporting database) between 1998 and 2000 (0.01% incidence). The median age of the patients was 73.5 years (range 59 to 91 years), and median duration of bicalutamide exposure was 7.5 weeks (range 1 to 312 weeks). Cases of interstitial pneumonitis have also been reported in association with flutamide, nilutamide, and gonadotropin-releasing hormone (GnRH) agonists.

== Risk of death ==
In men with early prostate cancer, bicalutamide has been shown to increase the likelihood of death due to causes other than prostate cancer. This was shown in the SPCG-6 substudy (n=1218) of the EPC programme, in which overall survival was significantly worse in the 150 mg/day bicalutamide monotherapy group compared to the placebo/standard care group (HR = 1.47; 95% CI = 1.06–2.03). There was also a near-significant trend toward increased overall mortality in the combined programme (n=8113) (HR = 1.16; 95% CI = 0.99–1.37; p=0.07). At 5.4 years of follow-up for the EPC programme, the overall incidence of death was 25.2% in the bicalutamide group and 20.5% in the placebo/standard care group. This was because more bicalutamide than placebo/standard care recipients had died due to causes unrelated to prostate cancer (16.8% vs. 9.5% at 5.4-year follow-up; 10.2% vs. 9.2% at 7.4-year follow-up). Bicalutamide reduced mortality due to prostate cancer, but this was not sufficient to overcome the increase in mortality due to non-prostate-cancer causes. Other trials, such as NRG/RTOG 9601, have also reported increased mortality with bicalutamide. Consequent to the EPC programme findings, authorization of bicalutamide for the treatment of LPC was revoked, and use of bicalutamide for this indication was discontinued. Bicalutamide continues to be authorized and used in the treatment of LAPC and mPC, where the benefits of bicalutamide against prostate cancer outweigh any influence on non-prostate-cancer mortality.

The reasons for the increased overall mortality with bicalutamide seen in the EPC programme have not been fully elucidated. In any case, at 7.4-year follow-up, there were numerically more deaths from heart failure (1.2% vs. 0.6%) and gastrointestinal cancer (1.3% vs. 0.9%) in the bicalutamide group relative to placebo/standard care recipients. It has been said that there was no consistent pattern suggestive of drug-related toxicity for bicalutamide and that the causes were likely a consequence of androgen deprivation:

The increased number of deaths in patients with localized disease receiving bicalutamide was meticulously investigated and they appeared to be due to a number of small imbalances rather than a specific cause. In addition, no direct toxic effect on any organ system could be identified. From this it may be speculated that the excess deaths in patients who are at low risk from prostate cancer mortality reflect the impact of endocrine therapy (rather than bicalutamide in particular). [...] The increased number of non-prostate cancer deaths in the early castration therapy arm [(via orchiectomy or GnRH monotherapy)] in the [Medical Research Council] study suggests that the trend towards an increased number of deaths in patients with localized disease in the present study is a reflection of early endocrine therapy as a concept rather than a bicalutamide-related phenomenon.

The increased number of deaths in bicalutamide-treated patients under watchful waiting with localized disease appears to be due to the accumulation of several small imbalances in various causes of death rather than an identifiable specific cause. However, an indirect effect from androgen receptor blockade, or some other unknown hormonally mediated effect, can neither be confirmed nor refuted with current data.

Low testosterone levels in men have been associated in epidemiological studies with cardiovascular disease as well as with a variety of other disease states. These include hypertension, hypercholesterolemia, diabetes, obesity, Alzheimer's disease, osteoporosis, and frailty. In any case, although bicalutamide monotherapy blocks the actions of androgens, it simultaneously preserves relatively high estradiol levels in men. This would potentially be expected to reduce or offset many of the risks of sex hormone deprivation. Yet increased mortality has still been seen with bicalutamide monotherapy in men in clinical trials.

== Modification of side effects by castration ==
Combination of bicalutamide with medical (i.e., a GnRH analogue) or surgical castration modifies the side-effect profile of bicalutamide. Some of its side effects, including breast pain/tenderness and gynecomastia, are far less likely to occur when the drug is combined with a GnRH analogue, while certain other side effects, including hot flashes, depression, fatigue, and sexual dysfunction, occur much more frequently in combination with a GnRH analogue. It is thought that this is due to the suppression of estrogen levels (in addition to androgen levels) by GnRH analogues, as estrogens may compensate for various negative central effects of androgen deprivation. If bicalutamide is combined with a GnRH analogue or surgical castration, the elevation of androgen and estrogen levels in men caused by bicalutamide will be prevented and the side effects of excessive estrogens, namely gynecomastia, will be reduced. However, due to the loss of estrogen, bone loss will accelerate and the risk of osteoporosis developing with long-term therapy will increase.
