= FinnProstate Group =

Finnish scientific researchers

The FinnProstate Group (FP), or FinnProstate Study Group, is a group of scientific researchers in Finland who have conducted a series of clinical trials of treatments for prostate cancer. The first publication by the group was in 1985 and the latest publication was in 2019.

== Clinical trials ==
The studies conducted by the FinnProstate group include the following:

- FinnProstate-1 (FinnProstate-I; Finnish Multicentre Study of Prostatic Cancer) – ethinylestradiol 150 μg/day (1 mg/day initially) plus polyestradiol phosphate 80 mg/month (160 mg/month initially) versus orchiectomy for advanced prostate cancer
- FinnProstate-2 (FinnProstate-II) – polyestradiol phosphate 160 mg/month (with or without low-dose aspirin) versus orchiectomy for advanced prostate cancer
- FinnProstate-3 (FinnProstate-III) – cancelled
- FinnProstate-4 (FinnProstate-IV) – polyestradiol phosphate 160 mg/month versus buserelin (with cyproterone acetate 300 mg/day initially to prevent gonadotropin flare) in advanced or metastatic prostate cancer
- FinnProstate-5 (FinnProstate-V) – cancelled
- FinnProstate-6 (FinnProstate-VI) – polyestradiol phosphate 240 month (320 mg/month initially) versus orchiectomy for advanced prostate cancer
- FinnProstate-7 (FinnProstate-VII) – intermittent versus continuous androgen deprivation therapy for advanced prostate cancer
- Other studies by the FinnProstate group

=== Related trials ===
A related study, by the Finnish Zoladex Multicentre Study Group, assessed polyestradiol phosphate versus goserelin for advanced prostate cancer. A British group also assessed polyestradiol phosphate 160 mg/month versus orchiectomy for advanced prostate cancer. The SPCG-5 trial assessed polyestradiol phosphate 240 mg/month versus combined androgen blockade (triptorelin or orchiectomy plus flutamide) for advanced prostate cancer.

== See also ==
- Scandinavian Prostate Cancer Group
- Prostate Adenocarcinoma: TransCutaneous Hormones
