= Indication (medicine) =

Valid reason to use a certain test, medication, procedure, or surgery

In medicine, an indication is a valid reason to use a certain test, medication, procedure, or surgery. There can be multiple indications to use a procedure or medication. An indication can commonly be confused with the term diagnosis. A diagnosis is the assessment that a particular medical condition is present while an indication is a reason for use. The opposite of an indication is a contraindication, a reason to withhold a certain medical treatment because the risks of treatment clearly outweigh the benefits.

In the US, indications for prescription drugs are approved by the Food and Drug Administration (FDA). Indications are included in the Indications and Usage section of the Prescribing Information. The primary role of this section of labeling is to enable health care practitioners to readily identify appropriate therapies for patients by clearly communicating the drug's approved indication(s). The Indications and Usage section states the disease or condition, or manifestation or symptoms thereof, for which the drug is approved, as well as whether the drug is indicated for the treatment, prevention, mitigation, cure, relief, or diagnosis of that disease or condition. Additionally, the Indications and Usage section should contain the approved age groups as well as other information necessary to describe appropriate use (for example, identifying the indicated patient/disease subgroups, stating if adjunctive therapy is required).

== Drugs ==
Most countries and jurisdictions have a licensing body whose duty is to determine whether to approve a drug for a specific indication, based on the relative safety of the drug and its efficacy for the particular use. In the United States, indications for medications are regulated by the Food and Drug Administration (FDA), and are included in the package insert under the phrase "Indications and Usage". The European Medicines Agency (EMA) holds this responsibility for centrally authorized drugs in the European Union.

=== Label indications vs. off-label indications ===
In the US, there are label indications and off-label indications.

Label indications
Medication that have label indications mean that they were approved by the FDA. This means that they are clinically significant for the indication and manufacturers are allowed to market their drug for the indication. A drug can have more than one FDA labeled indication, which means that it can be used for multiple medical conditions. As the evidence and consensus for use of the drug increases and strengthens, its class of indication is improved. Preferred drugs (and other treatments) are also referred to a "first line" or "primary" while others are called "second line", "third line" etc. A drug may be indicated as an "adjunct" or "adjuvant", added to a first line drug.

Off-label
Off-label indications are drugs that are used for medical indications that have not been approved by the FDA. Off-label indications often have some clinical significance to back the use, but they have not gone through the extensive testing required by the FDA to have an official labeled indication. Drug companies can not provide any official medication information (such as package inserts) for off-label indications.

=== FDA approval ===
The purpose for adding FDA-approved indications in the United States is to ensure that healthcare providers can easily identify appropriate use of drug therapy. Gaining FDA approval is based on the body of scientific evidence supporting the effectiveness of a drug treatment. The scientific evidence is gathered in the first 3 steps in the drug development process: discovery and development, pre-clinical research (testing safety), and clinical research (testing efficacy). After there is adequate completion of research and development phases by the drug companies, they send a New Drug Application (NDA) or a Biologics License Application (BLA) for approval to the FDA's Center for Drug Evaluation and Research (CDER) and the proposed scientific evidence for use in an intended population is evaluated by a team of physicians, statisticians, chemists, pharmacologists, and other scientists. Essentially, if it is found that there is substantial evidence that benefits of treatment outweigh the risks, the proposed labeling in the Prescribing Information is appropriate, and the manufacturing process is safe and adequate, then the drug is approved to go to market under that now FDA-approved indication. Even after approval, the FDA CDER continues to do postmarking surveillance of the drug through MedWatch and FDA Adverse Event Reporting System (FAERS).

=== Effect on drug pricing ===
Indications can impact the pricing of medications through Value-based Pricing, also known as indication specific pricing or indication value-based pricing. Since drugs can be used for different indications, this form of pricing would set different prices for each indication based on the value the drug offers for whatever it is being used to treat. This pricing scheme is often discussed in relation to oncology drugs, which are costly. Oncology drugs can be used for multiple different types of cancers so by applying indication-specific pricing, the drug would be priced based on how effective it is for treating each type of cancer. If the drug is more effective for Cancer A than Cancer B, then the patient taking the drug to treat Cancer A will pay more than the person using it for Cancer B because they receive more value from it.

Currently, most medications in the United States are priced the same regardless of what they're being used for or how effective they are at improving outcomes. Concerns were therefore raised that patients and insurers may be paying too high prices for indications with a relatively low clinical value. Thereby pharmaceutical companies could realize high returns and firm valuations. Companies like CVS and Express Scripts in the US have begun implementing pricing based on indication and in countries like Italy, similar forms of pricing are already being used. For example, Express Scripts' Oncology Care Value Program uses indication-based pricing for certain oncology medications and was launched in 2016. Italy on the other hand, uses a model similar to indication-based pricing where the amount the hospital pays for certain drugs varies based on what it's used for. Patients can receive reimbursements for treatments based on their response and either be fully or partially refunded. Italy's reimbursement system is run by AIFA, the Italian Medicines Agency, which is the national authority that regulates drugs in Italy. In contrast, Germany and France use weighted-average pricing – a pricing system that calculates a single price based on the average volume and value of all approved indications. Using weighted-average pricing effectively reduces cancer drugs' list prices as new indications are approved. England, Scotland, and Canada use another form of indirect indication-based pricing: differential discounts on single list prices for each indication. Furthermore, European countries were shown to restrict coverage to supplemental low-value indications using clinical coverage restrictions or financial coverage restrictions, such as managed entry agreements.

=== Incorporating indication of use on prescription drug labeling ===
There has been some thought on incorporating the indication in prescription drug labeling as an approach to improve patient understanding of the medications they are on. This information can help healthcare providers reduce medication errors related to drugs that may look and sound alike. Knowing the indication of the drug can also help providers determine if the dose of the drug is appropriate per indication, and this can greatly improve patient safety and drug effectiveness.

However, there are still some challenges with incorporating the indication of use on prescription drug labels. Revealing the indication of use on prescription drug labels can breach patient confidentiality since the label will disclose private information publicly. Some medications can also be used for multiple diseases and one disease may have multiple medications for its prevention or treatment, therefore adding an indication on prescription labels in these cases may cause some confusion and may not be able to actually fit onto the label.

== Medical tests ==
Each test has its own indications and contraindications, but in a simplified fashion, how much a test is indicated for an individual depends largely on its net benefit for that individual, which largely depends on the absolute difference between pre- and post-test probability of conditions (such as diseases) that the test is expected to achieve. Additional factors that influence a decision whether a medical test should be performed or not include: cost of the test, time taken for the test or other practical or administrative aspects. The possible benefits of a diagnostic test may also be weighed against the costs of unnecessary tests and resulting unnecessary follow-up and possibly even unnecessary treatment of incidental findings.
