= Scandinavian Prostate Cancer Group =

Scientific research group

The Scandinavian Prostate Cancer Group (SPCG) is a group of scientific researchers who have conducted a series of clinical trials of treatments for prostate cancer. The group was founded in 1981 and the first study, SPCG-1, began in 1984.

== Clinical trials ==
The studies conducted by the SPCG include the following:

- SPCG-1 – estramustine phosphate versus diethylstilbestrol for high-risk advanced prostate cancer
- SPCG-2 – orchiectomy plus cyproterone acetate versus placebo for metastatic prostate cancer
- SPCG-3 – cancelled
- SPCG-4 – radical prostatectomy versus watchful waiting for localized prostate cancer
- SPCG-5 – polyestradiol phosphate versus triptorelin or orchiectomy plus flutamide for advanced prostate cancer
- SPCG-6 – bicalutamide monotherapy versus standard care (watchful waiting) for localized prostate cancer
- SPCG-7 – endocrine therapy with versus without radiotherapy for locally advanced or aggressive localized prostate cancer
- SPCG-8 – cancelled
- SPCG-9 – cancelled
- SPCG-10 – cancelled
- SPCG-11 (Zometa European Study [ZEUS]) – zoledronic acid with standard prostate cancer therapy versus standard prostate cancer therapy alone for prevention of bone metastases in high-risk localized prostate cancer
- SPCG-12 – docetaxel versus surveillance after radical prostatectomy without androgen deprivation therapy for high-risk localized prostate cancer
- SPCG-13 – docetaxel versus surveillance after radical prostatectomy with androgen deprivation therapy for high-risk localized prostate cancer
- SPCG-14 – docetaxel versus bicalutamide for prostate-specific antigen recurrence after radical prostatectomy or radiotherapy for localized prostate cancer
- SPCG-15 – radical prostatectomy versus radiotherapy plus androgen deprivation therapy for locally advanced prostate cancer

The SPCG-6 study was also known as Trial 25 of the Early Prostate Cancer (EPC) clinical trial programme.

== Other work ==
The SPCG also published a 1997 literature review on combined androgen blockade for advanced prostate cancer.

== See also ==
- FinnProstate Group
