= EM-5854 =

Chemical compound

Clinical data
- Other names: 4-Fluoro-17β-hydroxy-17α-[(1-oxidopyridin-1-ium-4-yl)methyl]estra-1,3,5(10)-triene-3-carbonitrile
- Drug class: Steroidal antiandrogen

Identifiers
- IUPAC name: (8R,9S,13S,14S,17R)-4-fluoro-17-hydroxy-13-methyl-17-[(1-oxidopyridin-1-ium-4-yl)methyl]-7,8,9,11,12,14,15,16-octahydro-6H-cyclopenta[a]phenanthrene-3-carbonitrile
- CAS Number: 1071831-57-6
- PubChem CID: 25015772
- ChemSpider: 129562350
- CompTox Dashboard (EPA): DTXSID901336352

Chemical and physical data
- Formula: C_{25}H_{27}FN_{2}O_{2}
- Molar mass: 406.501 g·mol^{−1}
- 3D model (JSmol): Interactive image
- SMILES: C[C@]12CC[C@H]3[C@H]([C@@H]1CC[C@]2(CC4=CC=[N+](C=C4)[O-])O)CCC5=C3C=CC(=C5F)C#N
- InChI: InChI=1S/C25H27FN2O2/c1-24-10-6-19-18-3-2-17(15-27)23(26)21(18)5-4-20(19)22(24)7-11-25(24,29)14-16-8-12-28(30)13-9-16/h2-3,8-9,12-13,19-20,22,29H,4-7,10-11,14H2,1H3/t19-,20-,22+,24+,25-/m1/s1; Key:YKLVHERADAJQQV-NGQKKBAQSA-N

EM-5854 is a steroidal antiandrogen which was under development by Endoceutics, Inc. (formerly Endorecherche, Inc.) for the treatment of prostate cancer. It was first described in a patent in 2008, and was further characterized in 2012. EM-5854 reached phase I/II clinical trials for the treatment of prostate cancer but development was discontinued in March 2019.

The drug acts as a potent and selective competitive antagonist of the androgen receptor (AR). Unlike other steroidal antiandrogens like cyproterone acetate, but similarly to nonsteroidal antiandrogens like bicalutamide and enzalutamide, EM-5854 is a pure or silent antagonist of the AR and shows no intrinsic partial androgenic activity. EM-5854 and its metabolite EM-5855 show 3.7-fold and 94-fold higher affinity for the human AR than bicalutamide (0.66% and 17% of the RBA of metribolone, respectively, compared to 0.18% for bicalutamide). They also show dramatically increased antiandrogenic potency relative to bicalutamide in in vivo assays. On the basis of the available research, it has been said that EM-5854 may possibly have 70- to 140-fold the antiandrogenic potency of bicalutamide in humans. EM-5854 and EM-5855 show little to no affinity for other steroid hormone receptors including the estrogen, progesterone, and glucocorticoid receptors. EM-5854 bears a cyano phenyl group, the structural motif of the nonsteroidal antiandrogens.

EM-5854 and other AR antagonists at steroid hormone receptors and in AR-dependent cancer cell lines
Activity	Specifics	Bica	Flu	OH‑Flu	Enza	EM‑5854	EM‑5855
AR RBA (%)	Human	0.18	NA	0.17	0.07	0.66	17
Metri = 100%	Rat	0.13	NA	0.07	0.02	0.35	2.6
Shionogi cells AA activity	Ki (nM)	81	NA	NA	170	2.0	0.77
LNCaP cells (PSA) AA activity and stim of basal prolif	De_{50} (nM) (Inhib at 10^{−7} M (%))	1750 (6 ± 10)	NA	NA	1380 (−20 ± 3)	127 (36 ± 7)	66 (66 ± 1)
LNCaP cells (PSA) AA activity and stim of basal prolif	Stim at 10^{−7} M (%)	0 ± 1	NA	NA	1 ± 1	19 ± 1	29 ± 2
ER RBA (%)	Rat (E2 = 100%)	0	NA	0	0	0	0
PR RBA (%)	Rat (Prom = 100%)	ND	NA	0	ND	0.2	ND
GR RBA (%)	Rat (Dexa = 100%)	0	NA	0	<0.1	0	0
