= FEDRA =

FEDRA or Fedra may refer to:

== Science and technology ==
- Farmacovigilancia Española, Datos de Reacciones Adversas, a Spanish pharmacovigilance database
- FedRAMP, a United States based cyber security program
- Fedratinib, a chemical compound that is used to treat cancer

== People ==
- Fedra López, Argentinian actress and model
- Fedra Luna, Argentinian athlete and champion

== Opera ==
- Fedra (Mayr), an opera composed by Simon Mayr
- Fedra (Pizzetti), an opera composed by Ildebrando Pizzetti

== Movies ==
- Fedra (film), a Spanish drama film

== Ships ==
- MV Fedra, Liberan cargo ship that crashed into rocks and sunk in Europa Point

== Fictional elements ==
- Federal Disaster Response Agency, a fictional United States agency in The Last of Us video game franchise
