= ZM-182345 =

Chemical compound

Identifiers
- IUPAC name: 2-Hydroxy-N-[4-nitro-3-(trifluoromethyl)phenyl]-4-phenyl-2-(trifluoromethyl)pentanamide
- CAS Number: 314046-50-9
- PubChem CID: 10478916
- ChemSpider: 8654324
- UNII: QEP7377LSU
- CompTox Dashboard (EPA): DTXSID801337090

Chemical and physical data
- Formula: C_{19}H_{16}F_{6}N_{2}O_{4}
- Molar mass: 450.337 g·mol^{−1}
- 3D model (JSmol): Interactive image
- SMILES: CC(CC(C(=O)NC1=CC(=C(C=C1)[N+](=O)[O-])C(F)(F)F)(C(F)(F)F)O)C2=CC=CC=C2
- InChI: InChI=1S/C19H16F6N2O4/c1-11(12-5-3-2-4-6-12)10-17(29,19(23,24)25)16(28)26-13-7-8-15(27(30)31)14(9-13)18(20,21)22/h2-9,11,29H,10H2,1H3,(H,26,28); Key:RETGATTXHQWSOT-UHFFFAOYSA-N

ZM-182345 is a nonsteroidal progestin that was never marketed. It was derived from structural modification of the nonsteroidal antiandrogen hydroxyflutamide. ZM-182345 was found to be at least as potent as progesterone as a progestogen in animals but to also possess androgenic activity.
