= AC-102 =

Clinical data
- Other names: AC102; 6-fluoroharmane; fluoroharmane
- Routes of administration: Directly into the ear as a gel
- Drug class: Experimental drug; hearing restoration drug

Identifiers
- IUPAC name: 6-fluoro-1-methyl-9H-pyrido[3,4-b]indole
- CAS Number: 461424-22-6
- PubChem CID: 44269451
- ChemSpider: 23113606
- UNII: QR36464ZAD
- ChEMBL: ChEMBL14787

Chemical and physical data
- Formula: C_{12}H_{9}FN_{2}
- Molar mass: 200.216 g·mol^{−1}
- 3D model (JSmol): Interactive image
- SMILES: CC1=NC=CC2=C1NC3=C2C=C(C=C3)F
- InChI: InChI=1S/C12H9FN2/c1-7-12-9(4-5-14-7)10-6-8(13)2-3-11(10)15-12/h2-6,15H,1H3; Key:SXFHVXCWQOKTFY-UHFFFAOYSA-N

AC-102, also known as fluoroharmane, is a drug candidate being developed by the German company AudioCure Pharma for the treatment of acute sensorineural hearing loss (sudden hearing loss), acoustic trauma, and potentially various inner ear disorders. It is designed as a targeted alternative to standard glucocorticoid hormones due to its direct action within the inner ear. Additionally, AC-102 is recognized as a potential neuroprotective agent.

As a result, a Phase I clinical trial in a small group of young and completely healthy volunteers—42 people under 40 years old—demonstrated that the administration of AC-102 is a safe and well-tolerated method of drug delivery to the inner ear in healthy volunteers with normal hearing.

== Pharmacology ==
=== Pharmacodynamics ===
In an animal model (also in vivo) of acoustic trauma, AC-102 significantly preserved auditory thresholds by protecting hair cells and inner hair cell synapses. Rommelspacher and his group previously demonstrated that AC102 significantly protects cells following exposure to rotenone, a mitochondrial toxin that causes acute cellular damage. Notably, it also significantly increased ATP levels and reduced ROS accumulation through a cell-level mechanism rather than direct scavenging of free radicals. Furthermore, it is highlighted that AC102 treatment led to a significant stimulation of neurite outgrowth, which was more pronounced than that induced by endogenous neurotrophins such as neurotrophin-3 and brain-derived neurotrophic factor. Nevertheless, despite its broad spectrum of action, the biological target remains unknown.

In one animal study utilizing an AC-102 gel, the subjects were divided into an AC102 group and a placebo group. In the AC102 group, deterioration halted as early as day 3, and the ear began to recover rapidly. Thus, the drug reduced the phase of post-operative inflammation and tissue destruction by more than half, whereas inflammation continued to increase in the placebo group. At mid-frequencies (2.0–5.0 kHz), the animals treated with AC-102 heard an average of 37.9 to 56.9 dB better than the placebo group. At high frequencies (6.3 to 32 kHz)—the area where the electrode caused the most friction against the tissues—the protective effect reached 56 to 74 dB.

Also in the same study, the in vivo model demonstrated that AC-102 significantly preserves hair cells, primarily inner hair cells (IHCs) and outer hair cells (OHCs). Upon electrode insertion in the control (placebo) group, these cells were almost completely destroyed, with only 4–13% remaining. In contrast, up to 33–50% of the cells survived in the AC-102-treated animals. Furthermore, slightly further from the electrode (in the middle zone), 100% of the cells survived in the AC102 group, compared to only 30–93% in the placebo group. At the site of severe trauma, the placebo group lost half of them, leaving only 39–50%, whereas the vast majority—74–94% of OHCs—survived in the AC102 group. Particularly noteworthy is the preservation of type II auditory nerve fibers (ANFs) and the maintenance of the IHC ribbon synapse, with the AC102 group showing nearly complete preservation of these contacts. Other animal studies confirm the pharmacological effect of AC-102.
