= STAMPEDE (clinical trial) =

Clinical trial investigating treatments for high risk or terminal prostate cancer

Systemic Therapy in Advancing or Metastatic Prostate Cancer: Evaluation of Drug Efficacy (STAMPEDE) is a clinical trial investigating treatments for high risk or terminal prostate cancer. Recruitment started in 2005 and ended in 2022; as of January 2020, over 10,000 participants had joined the trial.

== Name ==
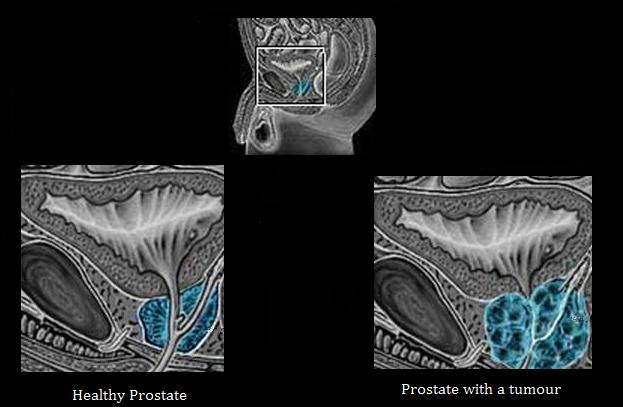
Differences between healthy prostate and a prostate with a tumour

STAMPEDE is an acronym for "Systemic Therapy in Advancing or Metastatic Prostate Cancer: Evaluation of Drug Efficacy".

== Aims and procedure ==
The trial investigates new approaches for men with metastatic and locally advanced prostate cancer. 117 hospitals in the UK and Switzerland are involved with over 10,000 men are expected to take part in the trial.

The men are randomly assigned to one of a number of "arms". The primary outcome by which the arms were judged is overall survival.

The following arms are documented in the publicly available literature.

=== Arm A ===
Standard of care (SOC) is lifelong androgen deprivation therapy (ADT). After 2015 SOC was expanded to include docetaxel and radiotherapy (RT) at the start of treatment.

=== Arm B ===
SOC plus zoledronic acid.

=== Arm C ===
Standard care plus docetaxel and prednisolone.

=== Arm D ===
SOC plus celecoxib.

=== Arm E ===
SOC plus zoledronic acid and docetaxel.

=== Arm F ===
SOC plus zoledronic acid and celecoxib.

=== Arm G ===
SOC plus abiraterone acetate and prednisolone.

=== Arm H ===
SOC plus RT.

=== Arm J ===
SOC plus abiraterone and enzalutamide and prednisolone.

=== Arm K ===
SOC plus metformin.

=== Arm L ===
SOC with transdermal oestradiol replacing standard ADT.

== Results ==
James, Sydes & Clarke 2016 reported that "the addition of docetaxel to standard of care was associated with improved survival, with an HR of 0·78 and a difference in median survival of 10 months, as well as improvements in prostate-cancer-specific survival, failure-free survival, and skeletal-related events". They also noted that docetaxel plus zoledronic acid "was associated with similar improvements, although the benefit observed was smaller". The overall conclusion was that "standard of care should be updated to include docetaxel chemotherapy in suitable patients with metastatic disease, and docetaxel may be considered for men with high-risk non-metastatic prostate cancer with or without radiotherapy".

Parker, James & Brawley 2018 reported on radiotherapy. For patients with a high metastatic burden the radiotherapy did not improve survival. No improvement was noted for unselected patients, but for men with a low burden overall survival did improve. There is some discussion as to how the burden is identified (CT and bone scans versus PET). The findings may also be applicable to other cancers where there is a small volume.

Cancer Research UK 2019 presents the main findings as:

- adding docetaxel to hormone therapy improves the length of time men live – this is called overall survival
- adding abiraterone to hormone therapy improves overall survival and delays the time until the cancer gets worse
- adding radiotherapy to hormone therapy in men with less prostate cancer spread improves overall survival
- celecoxib doesn’t help men live longer.

== See also ==
- Prostate Adenocarcinoma: TransCutaneous Hormones (PATCH)

== Bibliography ==
- Cancer Research UK (31 January 2019), A trial looking at hormone therapy with other treatments for prostate cancer (STAMPEDE trial results)
- James, Nicholas D; Sydes, Matthew R; Clarke, Noel W; et al. (19 March 2016), "Addition of docetaxel, zoledronic acid, or both to first-line long-term hormone therapy in prostate cancer (STAMPEDE): survival results from an adaptive, multiarm, multistage, platform randomised controlled trial", The Lancet, 387 (10024): 1163–77, doi:10.1016/S0140-6736(15)01037-5, PMC 4800035, PMID 26719232
- Medical Research Council (7 November 2018), "Systemic Therapy in Advancing or Metastatic Prostate Cancer: Evaluation of Drug Efficacy (STAMPEDE)", U.S. National Library of Medicine
- Parker, Christopher C; James, Nicholas D; Brawley, Christopher D; et al. (1 December 2018), "Radiotherapy to the primary tumour for newly diagnosed, metastatic prostate cancer (STAMPEDE): a randomised controlled phase 3 trial", The Lancet, 392 (10162): 2353–2366, doi:10.1016/S0140-6736(18)32486-3, PMC 6269599, PMID 30355464
