= Nilutamide =

Chemical compound

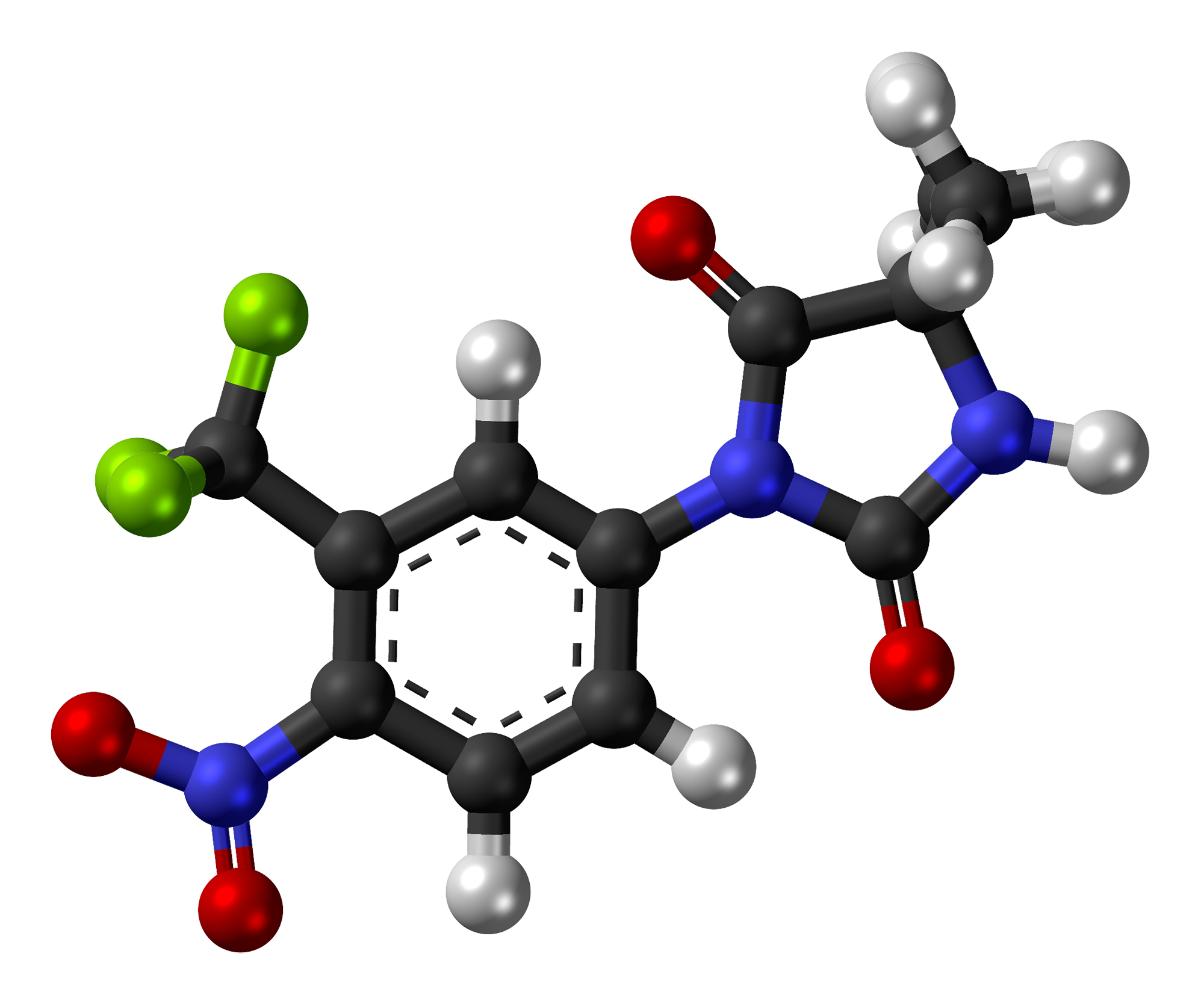

Clinical data
- Pronunciation: nye-LOO-tah-mide
- Trade names: Nilandron, Anandron
- Other names: RU-23908
- AHFS/Drugs.com: Monograph
- MedlinePlus: a697044
- Routes of administration: By mouth
- Drug class: Nonsteroidal antiandrogen
- ATC code: L02BB02 (WHO)

Legal status
- Legal status: In general: ℞ (Prescription only)

Pharmacokinetic data
- Bioavailability: Good
- Protein binding: 80–84%
- Metabolism: Liver (CYP2C19, FMO)
- Metabolites: At least 5, some active
- Elimination half-life: Mean: 56 hours (~2 days); Range: 23–87 hours
- Excretion: Urine: 62% Feces: <10%

Identifiers
- IUPAC name: 5,5-Dimethyl-3-[4-nitro-3-(trifluoromethyl)phenyl]imidazolidine-2,4-dione
- CAS Number: 63612-50-0
- PubChem CID: 4493
- IUPHAR/BPS: 2864
- DrugBank: DB00665
- ChemSpider: 4337
- UNII: 51G6I8B902
- KEGG: D00965
- ChEBI: CHEBI:7573
- ChEMBL: ChEMBL1274
- CompTox Dashboard (EPA): DTXSID3034165
- ECHA InfoCard: 100.153.268

Chemical and physical data
- Formula: C_{12}H_{10}F_{3}N_{3}O_{4}
- Molar mass: 317.224 g·mol^{−1}
- 3D model (JSmol): Interactive image
- Melting point: 149 °C (300 °F)
- SMILES: CC1(C(=O)N(C(=O)N1)C2=CC(=C(C=C2)[N+](=O)[O-])C(F)(F)F)C
- InChI: InChI=1S/C12H10F3N3O4/c1-11(2)9(19)17(10(20)16-11)6-3-4-8(18(21)22)7(5-6)12(13,14)15/h3-5H,1-2H3,(H,16,20); Key:XWXYUMMDTVBTOU-UHFFFAOYSA-N

Nilutamide, sold under the brand names Nilandron and Anandron, is a nonsteroidal antiandrogen (NSAA) which is used in the treatment of prostate cancer. It has also been studied as a component of feminizing hormone therapy for transgender women and to treat acne and seborrhea in women. It is taken by mouth.

Side effects in men include breast tenderness and enlargement, feminization, sexual dysfunction, and hot flashes. Nausea, vomiting, visual disturbances, alcohol intolerance, elevated liver enzymes, and lung disease can occur in both sexes. Rarely, nilutamide can cause respiratory failure and liver damage. These unfavorable side effects, along with a number of associated cases of death, have limited the use of nilutamide.

Nilutamide acts as a selective antagonist of the androgen receptor (AR), preventing the effects of androgens like testosterone and dihydrotestosterone (DHT) in the body. Because most prostate cancer cells rely on these hormones for growth and survival, nilutamide can slow the progression of prostate cancer and extend life in men with the disease.

Nilutamide was discovered in 1977 and was first introduced for medical use in 1987. It became available in the United States in 1996. The drug has largely been replaced by newer and improved NSAAs, namely bicalutamide and enzalutamide, due to their better efficacy, tolerability, and safety, and is now rarely used.

Nilutamide is a therapeutic alternative on the World Health Organization's List of Essential Medicines.

== Medical uses ==
=== Prostate cancer ===
Nilutamide is used in prostate cancer in combination with a gonadotropin-releasing hormone (GnRH) analogue at a dosage of 300 mg/day (150 mg twice daily) for the first 4 weeks of treatment, and 150 mg/day thereafter. It is not indicated as a monotherapy in prostate cancer. Only one small non-comparative study has assessed nilutamide as a monotherapy in prostate cancer.

Nilutamide has been used to prevent the effects of the testosterone flare at the start of GnRH agonist therapy in men with prostate cancer.

=== Transgender hormone therapy ===
Nilutamide has been studied for use as a component of feminizing hormone therapy for transgender women. It has been assessed in at least five small clinical studies for this purpose in treatment-naive subjects. In these studies, nilutamide monotherapy at a dosage of 300 mg/day, induced observable signs of clinical feminization in young transgender women (age range 19–33 years) within 8 weeks, including breast development, decreased body hair (though not facial hair), decreased morning erections and sex drive, and positive psychological and emotional changes. Signs of breast development occurred in all subjects within 6 weeks and were associated with increased nipple sensitivity, and along with decreased hair growth, were the earliest sign of feminization.

Nilutamide did not change the size of the prostate gland (which is the same as with high-dosage cyproterone acetate and ethinylestradiol treatment for as long as 18 months), but was found to alter its histology, including increased stromal tissue with a significant reduction in acini and atrophic epithelial cells, indicating glandular atrophy. In addition, readily apparent histological changes were observed in the testes, including a reduction in tubular and interstitial cells.

Nilutamide was found to more than double luteinizing hormone (LH) and testosterone levels and to triple estradiol levels. In contrast, follicle-stimulating hormone levels remained unchanged. A slight but significant increase in prolactin levels was observed, and levels of sex hormone-binding globulin increased as well. The addition of ethinylestradiol to nilutamide therapy after 8 weeks abolished the increase in LH, testosterone, and estradiol levels and dramatically suppressed testosterone levels, into the castrate range. Both nilutamide alone and the combination of nilutamide and estrogen were regarded as resulting in effective and favorable antiandrogen action and feminization in transgender women.

=== Skin conditions ===
Nilutamide has been assessed in the treatment of acne and seborrhea in women in at least one small clinical study. The dosage used was 200 mg/day, and in the study, "seborrhea and acne decreased markedly within the first month and practically disappeared after 2 months of [nilutamide] treatment."

=== Available forms ===
Nilutamide is available in the form of 50 and 150 mg oral tablets.

== Side effects ==
General side effects of NSAAs, including nilutamide, include gynecomastia, breast pain/tenderness, hot flashes (67%), depression, fatigue, sexual dysfunction (including loss of libido and erectile dysfunction), decreased muscle mass, and decreased bone mass with an associated increase in fractures. Also, nausea (24–27%), vomiting, constipation (20%), and insomnia (16%) may occur with nilutamide. Nilutamide monotherapy is known to eventually induce gynecomastia in 40 to 80% of men treated with it for prostate cancer, usually within 6 to 9 months of treatment initiation.

Relative to other NSAAs, nilutamide has been uniquely associated with mild and reversible visual disturbances (31–58%) including delayed ocular adaptation to darkness and impaired color vision, a disulfiram-like alcohol intolerance (19%), interstitial pneumonitis (0.77–2.4%) (which can result in dyspnea (1%) as a secondary effect and can progress to pulmonary fibrosis), and hepatitis (1%), and has a higher incidence of nausea and vomiting compared to other NSAAs. The incidence of interstitial pneumonitis with nilutamide has been found to be much higher in Japanese patients (12.6%), warranting particular caution in Asian individuals. There is a case report of simultaneous liver and lung toxicity in a nilutamide-treated patient.

There is also a risk of hepatotoxicity with nilutamide, though occurrence is very rare and the risk is significantly less than with flutamide. The incidence of abnormal liver function tests (e.g., elevated liver enzymes) has been variously reported as 2 to 33% with nilutamide. For comparison, the risk of elevated liver enzymes has been reported as 4 to 62% in the case of flutamide. The risk of hepatotoxicity with nilutamide has been described as far less than with flutamide. Fulminant hepatic failure has been reported for nilutamide, with fatal outcome. Between 1986 and 2003, the numbers of published cases of hepatotoxicity for antiandrogens totaled 46 for flutamide, 21 for cyproterone acetate, 4 for nilutamide, and 1 for bicalutamide. Similarly to flutamide, nilutamide exhibits mitochondrial toxicity in hepatocytes by inhibiting respiratory complex I (NADH ubiquinone oxidoreductase) (though not respiratory complexes II, III, or IV) in the electron transport chain, resulting in reduced ATP and glutathione production and thus decreased hepatocyte survival. The nitro group of nilutamide has been theorized to be involved in both its hepatotoxicity and its pulmonary toxicity.

Side effects of combined androgen blockade with nilutamide and surgical castration
Class	Side effect	Nilutamide 150 mg/day + orchiectomy (n = 225) (%)^{a,b}	Placebo + orchi- ectomy (n = 232) (%)^{a,b}
Cardiovascular system	Hypertension	5.3	2.6
Digestive system	Nausea	9.8	6.0
Digestive system	Constipation	7.1	3.9
Endocrine system	Hot flashes	28.4	22.4
Metabolic and nutritional system	Increased aspartate transaminase	8.0	3.9
Metabolic and nutritional system	Increased alanine transaminase	7.6	4.3
Nervous system	Dizziness	7.1	3.4
Respiratory system	Dyspnea	6.2	7.3
Special senses	Impaired adaptation to darkness	12.9	1.3
Special senses	Abnormal vision	6.7	1.7
Urogenital system	Urinary tract infection	8.0	9.1
Overall		86	81
Footnotes: ^{a} = Phase III studies of combined androgen blockade (nilutamide + orchiectomy) in men with advanced prostate cancer. ^{b} = Incidence ≥5% regardless of causality. Sources: See template.

Side effects of combined androgen blockade with nilutamide and a GnRH agonist
Class	Side effect	Nilutamide 150 mg/day + leuprorelin (n = 209) (%)^{a,b}	Placebo + leupro- relin (n = 202) (%)^{a,b}
Body as a whole	Pain	26.8	27.7
Body as a whole	Headache	13.9	10.4
Body as a whole	Asthenia	19.1	20.8
Body as a whole	Back pain	11.5	16.8
Body as a whole	Abdominal pain	10.0	5.4
Body as a whole	Chest pain	7.2	4.5
Body as a whole	Flu syndrome	7.2	3.0
Body as a whole	Fever	5.3	6.4
Cardiovascular system	Hypertension	9.1	9.9
Digestive system	Nausea	23.9	8.4
Digestive system	Constipation	19.6	16.8
Digestive system	Anorexia	11.0	6.4
Digestive system	Dyspepsia	6.7	4.5
Digestive system	Vomiting	5.7	4.0
Endocrine system	Hot flashes	66.5	59.4
Endocrine system	Erectile dysfunction	11.0	12.9
Endocrine system	Decreased libido	11.0	4.5
Hemic and lymphatic system	Anemia	7.2	6.4
Metabolic and nutritional system	Increased aspartate transaminase	12.9	13.9
Metabolic and nutritional system	Peripheral edema	12.4	17.3
Metabolic and nutritional system	Increased alanine transaminase	9.1	8.9
Musculoskeletal system	Bone pain	6.2	5.0
Nervous system	Insomnia	16.3	15.8
Nervous system	Dizziness	10.0	11.4
Nervous system	Depression	8.6	7.4
Nervous system	Hypesthesia	5.3	2.0
Respiratory system	Dyspnea	10.5	7.4
Respiratory system	Upper respiratory infection	8.1	10.9
Respiratory system	Pneumonia	5.3	3.5
Skin and appendages	Sweating	6.2	3.0
Skin and appendages	Decreased body hair	5.7	0.5
Skin and appendages	Dry skin	5.3	2.5
Skin and appendages	Rash	5.3	4.0
Special senses	Impaired adaptation to darkness	56.9	5.4
Special senses	Chromatopsia	8.6	0.0
Special senses	Impaired adaptation to light	7.7	1.0
Special senses	Abnormal vision	6.2	4.5
Urogenital system	Testicular atrophy	16.3	12.4
Urogenital system	Gynecomastia	10.5	11.9
Urogenital system	Urinary tract infection	8.6	21.3
Urogenital system	Hematuria	8.1	7.9
Urogenital system	Urinary tract disorder	7.2	10.4
Urogenital system	Nocturia	6.7	6.4
Overall		99.5	98.5
Footnotes: ^{a} = Phase III studies of combined androgen blockade (nilutamide + GnRH agonist) in men with advanced prostate cancer. ^{b} = Incidence ≥5% regardless of causality. Sources: See template.

== Pharmacology ==
=== Pharmacodynamics ===
==== Antiandrogenic activity ====
Affinities (Note: At androgen receptors; measured in human prostate tissue.)
Compound	RBA (Note: Relative to Metribolone, which is by definition 100%)
Metribolone	100
Dihydrotestosterone	85
Cyproterone acetate	7.8
Bicalutamide	1.4
Nilutamide	0.9
Hydroxyflutamide	0.57
Flutamide	<0.0057
Notes:

Nilutamide acts as a selective competitive silent antagonist of the AR (IC_{50} = 412 nM), which prevents androgens like testosterone and DHT from activating the receptor. The affinity of nilutamide for the AR is about 1 to 4% of that of testosterone and is similar to that of bicalutamide and 2-hydroxyflutamide. Similarly to 2-hydroxyflutamide, but unlike bicalutamide, nilutamide is able to weakly activate the AR at high concentrations. It does not inhibit 5α-reductase.

Like other NSAAs such as flutamide and bicalutamide, nilutamide, without concomitant GnRH analogue therapy, increases serum androgen (by two-fold in the case of testosterone), estrogen, and prolactin levels due to inhibition of AR-mediated suppression of steroidogenesis via negative feedback on the hypothalamic–pituitary–gonadal axis. As such, though nilutamide is still effective as an antiandrogen as a monotherapy, it is given in combination with a GnRH analogue such as leuprorelin in prostate cancer to suppress androgen concentrations to castrate levels in order to attain maximal androgen blockade (MAB).

Like flutamide and bicalutamide, nilutamide is able to cross the blood–brain barrier and has central antiandrogen actions.

Relative affinities of first-generation nonsteroidal antiandrogens for the androgen receptor
Species	IC_{50} (nM)			RBA (ratio)		
Species	Bicalutamide	2-Hydroxyflutamide	Nilutamide	Bica / 2-OH-flu	Bica / nilu	Ref
Rat	190	700	ND	4.0	ND	
Rat	~400	~900	~900	2.3	2.3	
Rat	ND	ND	ND	3.3	ND	
Rat^{a}	3595	4565	18620	1.3	5.2	
Human	~300	~700	~500	2.5	1.6	
Human	~100	~300	ND	~3.0	ND	
Human^{a}	2490	2345	5300	1.0	2.1	
Footnotes: ^{a} = Controversial data. Sources: See template.

==== Cytochrome P450 inhibition ====
Nilutamide is known to inhibit several cytochrome P450 enzymes, including CYP1A2, CYP2C9, and CYP3A4, and can result in increased levels of medications that are metabolized by these enzymes. It has also been found to inhibit the enzyme CYP17A1 (17α-hydroxylase/17,20-lyase) in vitro and thus the biosynthesis of androgens. However, nilutamide monotherapy significantly increases testosterone levels in vivo, so the clinical significance of this finding is uncertain.

=== Pharmacokinetics ===
Nilutamide has an elimination half-life of 23 to 87 hours, with a mean of 56 hours, or about two days; this allows for once-daily administration. Steady state (plateau) levels of the drug are attained after two weeks of administration with a dosage of 150 mg twice daily (300 mg/day total). It is metabolized by CYP2C19, with at least five metabolites. Virtually all of the antiandrogenic activity of nilutamide comes from the parent drug (as opposed to metabolites).

== Chemistry ==
Nilutamide is structurally related to the first-generation NSAAs flutamide and bicalutamide as well as to the second-generation NSAAs enzalutamide and apalutamide.

== History ==
Nilutamide was developed by Roussel and was first described in 1977. It was first introduced for medical use in 1987 in France and was the second NSAA to be marketed, with flutamide preceding it and bicalutamide following it in 1995. It was not introduced until 1996 in the United States.

== Society and culture ==
=== Generic names ===
Nilutamide is the generic name of the drug and its INN, USAN, BAN, and DCF.

=== Brand names ===
Nilutamide is marketed under the brand name Nilandron in the United States and under the brand name Anandron elsewhere in the world such as in Australia, Canada, Europe, and Latin America.

=== Availability ===
Nilutamide is or has been available in the United States, Canada, Australia, Europe, Latin America, Egypt, and Lebanon. In Europe, it is or has been available in Belgium, Croatia, the Czech Republic, Finland, France, the Netherlands, Norway, Poland, Portugal, Serbia, Sweden, Switzerland, and Yugoslavia. in Latin America, it is or has been available in Argentina, Brazil, and Mexico.

== Research ==
The combination of an estrogen and nilutamide as a form of combined androgen blockade for the treatment of prostate cancer has been studied in animals.

Nilutamide has been studied in the treatment of advanced breast cancer.
