= Androgen deprivation-induced senescence =

- Specialty: Endocrinology

Androgen deprivation-induced senescence (or ADIS) refers to the induction of cellular senescence as a result of androgen deprivation therapy. ADIS is observed in prostate cancer cells that are dependent on androgens for cell proliferation. Androgen withdrawal induces cells to undergo cellular senescence by up-regulating intracellular reactive oxygen species (ROS) that cause DNA damage. ADIS is maintained through the up-regulation of the cell cycle regulator p16ink4a.
