= Prostate Adenocarcinoma: TransCutaneous Hormones =

British study on prostate cancer

The Prostate Adenocarcinoma: TransCutaneous Hormones (PATCH) study is a large randomized controlled trial in the United Kingdom of high-dose transdermal estradiol patches versus gonadotropin-releasing hormone agonist therapy in the treatment of prostate cancer in men. It is specifically comparing three to four 100 μg/day estradiol patches (FemSeven or Progynova TS) against goserelin implants in approximately 2,200 men with prostate cancer. The study was started in March 2006 and is estimated for completion in August 2021, with additional reports expected in 2023 and 2024. Its objectives include comparison of survival, cardiovascular mortality and morbidity, pharmacological activity (e.g., suppression of testosterone levels), other side effects and toxicities, and quality of life. A report on long-term cardiovascular outcomes was published in February 2021, and other reports for the study have also been published.

Besides the PATCH trial, the Systemic Therapy in Advancing or Metastatic Prostate Cancer: Evaluation of Drug Efficacy (STAMPEDE) trial, also in the United Kingdom, added a high-dose transdermal estradiol patches arm with approximately 2,000 men in July 2017.
