= Farmacovigilancia Española, Datos de Reacciones Adversas =

The Farmacovigilancia Española, Datos de Reacciones Adversas (FEDRA), also known as the Spanish Pharmacovigilance Datatabase or Spanish Pharmacovigilance System, is a pharmacovigilance database in Spain which was developed in 1982.

== See also ==
- Pharmacovigilance
- FDA Adverse Event Reporting System (FAERS)
