= EHealthMe =

American medical analysis website

eHealthMe.com
- Industry: Pharmaceutical
- Founded: 2008
- Headquarters: Mountain View, California
- Key people: Johnson Chen
- Website: ehealthme.com

eHealthMe.com is an American medical analysis website launched in 2008. As of October 2020, the company claims to be monitoring 47,090 drugs and supplements. The company conducts analysis on data from the U.S. Food and Drug Administration (FDA), and the wider community going back to 1977 to provide post-marketing phase information.

== History ==
eHealthMe was publicly launched in 2008 by Madison, Wisconsin based HealthLatLLC. It was founded by Johnson Chen, who was formerly a healthcare consultant with Deloitte.

== Activity ==
The company carries out independent research, such as the studies into the side effects of statins, specifically occurrences of rhabdomyolysis in 2008. Patients also use the website for self-reporting adverse drug effects.
