= Androgen deprivation therapy =

Hormonal treatment for prostate cancer

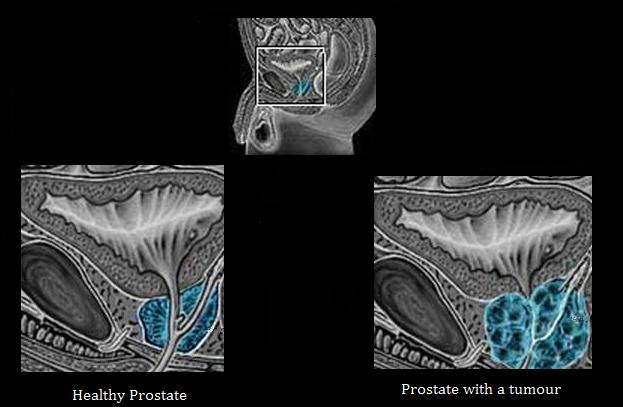
- Differences between a healthy prostate and a prostate with a tumour
- Other names: Androgen suppression therapy
- Specialty: Oncology

Androgen deprivation therapy (ADT), also called androgen ablation therapy or androgen suppression therapy, is an antihormone therapy whose main use is in treating prostate cancer. Prostate cancer cells usually require androgen hormones, such as testosterone, to grow. ADT reduces the levels of androgen hormones, with drugs or surgery, to prevent the prostate cancer cells from growing. The pharmaceutical approaches include antiandrogens and chemical castration.

Several studies have concluded that ADT has demonstrated benefit in patients with metastatic disease, and as an adjunct to radiation therapy in patients with locally advanced disease, as well as those with unfavorable intermediate-risk or high-risk localized disease. However, in patients with low-risk prostate cancer, ADT has demonstrated no survival advantage, and significant harm, such as impotence, diabetes and bone loss.

The therapy can also eliminate cancer cells by inducing androgen deprivation-induced senescence. Lowering androgen levels or stopping them from getting into prostate cancer cells often makes prostate cancer shrink or grow more slowly for a time. However, this treatment needs to be combined with radiation therapy (RT) because ADT itself does not eradicate the cancer; it just decreases its aggressiveness.

== Types ==
=== Method based on surgery ===
- Orchiectomy (surgical castration)

It consists of removing the testicles, the organ where androgens are synthesized, of the cancer patient. It is the most radical treatment for ending the production of androgens. Moreover, it is the easiest and least expensive one. The main disadvantage is that surgical castration is a permanent method.

=== Methods based on drugs ===
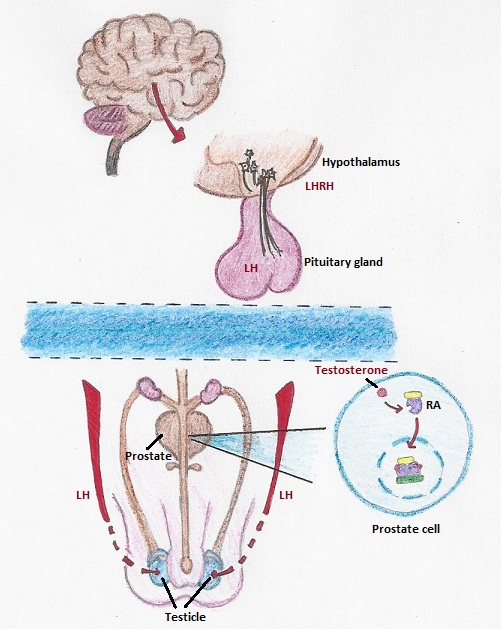
Testosterone synthesizing process

- Chemical castration

The synthesis of testosterone is mediated by a chain of processes that start in the brain. When the body detects a low level of testosterone, the hypothalamus starts to produce GnRH. GnRH activates the synthesis of LH (Luteinizing hormone) within the pituitary gland. LH induces testosterone synthesis within the testicles. There are two different medicines, GnRH agonists and antagonists, which both lower the amount of testosterone made by the testicles. They work by inhibiting the formation of LH in the pituitary gland. The GnRH agonists produce a sudden increase on levels of testosterone followed by a huge falling, process called flare, whereas GnRH antagonists decrease directly the amount of testosterone. GnRH agonists and antagonists used in androgen deprivation therapy include leuprolide, goserelin, triptorelin, histrelin, buserelin, and degarelix.
These drugs are injected under the skin achieving the same result as surgical castration. Chemical castration may be preferred to surgical castration as it keeps the testes intact.

- Antiandrogen therapy

Adrenal glands were discovered as another center of androgen production even after a castration process. Therefore a complementary treatment was developed that uses antiandrogens to block the body's ability to use any androgens. Prostate cells contain an androgen receptor (AR) that, when stimulated by androgens like testosterone, promotes growth and maintains prostatic differentiation. These pro-growth signals, however, can be problematic when they occur in a cancer cell. Antiandrogens can enter cells and prevent the binding of testosterone to the receptor proteins, due to their higher affinity for the androgen receptor.
The main antiandrogens are cyproterone acetate, flutamide, nilutamide, bicalutamide, and enzalutamide which are all administered in oral tablet form.

New antiandrogens that target testosterone synthesis (abiraterone acetate and seviteronel) or AR nuclear translocation (enzalutamide, apalutamide, and darolutamide), as well as combined therapies (galeterone) have been recently developed and may function to better target androgen-responsive cells in combination with ADT. But these too may have negative adverse roles in the development of castration-resistant prostate cancer.

== Effects on male hormonal balance ==
Normal male sexuality depends upon very specific and complicated hormonal patterns that are not completely understood. One study suggests that ADT can alter the hormonal balance necessary for male sexual activity. As men age, testosterone levels decrease by about 1% a year after age 30; however, it is important to determine whether low testosterone is due to normal aging, or to a disease, such as hypogonadism. Testosterone plays a significant role in sexual functioning; therefore, naturally declining levels of testosterone can lead to reduction in normal sexual functioning. Further decreases in serum testosterone can have a negative impact on normal sexual function, leading to a decline in quality of life.

Erectile dysfunction is not uncommon after radical prostatectomy and men who undergo ADT in addition to this are likely to show further decline in their ability to engage in penetrative intercourse, as well as their desire to do so. A study looking at the differences of using GnRH-A (and androgen suppressant) or an orchiectomy report differences in sexual interest, the experience of erections, and the prevalence of participating in sexual activity. Men reporting no sexual interest increased from 27.6% to 63.6% after orchiectomy, and from 31.7% to 58.0% after GnRH-A; men who experienced no erections increased from 35.0% to 78.6%; and men who did not report engaging in sexual activity increased from 47.9% to 82.8% after orchiectomy and 45.0% to 80.2%. This study suggests that the GnRH-A and orchiectomy had similar effects on sexual functioning. A vicious cycle whereby lowering testosterone levels leads to decreased sexual activity, which in turn cause both free and total testosterone levels to decline even further. This demonstrates the importance of androgens for maintaining sexual structures and functions.

== Adverse effects ==
Although targeting the androgen axis has clear therapeutic benefit, its effectiveness is temporary, as prostate tumor cells adapt to survive and grow. The removal of androgens has been shown to activate epithelial–mesenchymal transition (EMT), neuroendocrine transdifferentiation (NEtD) and cancer stem cell-like gene programs.

- EMT has established roles in promoting biological phenotypes associated with tumor progression (migration/invasion, tumor cell survival, cancer stem cell-like properties, resistance to radiation and chemotherapy) in multiple human cancer types.
- NEtD in prostate cancer is associated with resistance to therapy, visceral metastasis, and aggressive disease.
- Cancer stem cell phenotypes are associated with disease recurrence, metastasis, and cell survival in circulation as circulating tumor cells.

Thus, activation of these programs via inhibition of the androgen axis provides a mechanism by which tumor cells can adapt to promote disease recurrence and progression.

Orchiectomy, LHRH analogs and LHRH antagonists can all cause similar side effects, due to changes in the levels of sex hormones (testosterone).

A program has been developed for patients and their partners to recognize and manage the more burdensome side effects of androgen deprivation therapy. One program is built around the 2014 book "Androgen Deprivation Therapy: An Essential Guide for Prostate Cancer Patients and Their Loved Ones", which is endorsed by the Canadian Urological Association.

Recent studies have shown ADT may increase the risk of Alzheimer's disease or dementia. The increase in risk may be associated with duration of ADT. While some studies report a decline in certain areas of cognitive function such as spatial abilities, attention, and verbal memory associated with ADT, evidence as a whole remains contradictory. Useful preventative interventions may include social interaction, physical exercise and a "Mediterranean diet", among others. There is an additional small risk of cardiac arrhythmias. Prostate cancer patients receiving treatment with ADT are three times more likely to commit suicide than men who are not treated with ADT.

== See also ==
- Estrogen deprivation therapy
- Maximum androgen blockade
