= Dose-ranging study =

Clinical trial comparing doses of an agent

A dose-ranging study is a clinical trial where different doses of an agent (e.g. a drug) are tested against each other to establish which dose works best and/or is least harmful.

Dose-ranging is usually a pre-clinical, phase I or early phase II clinical trial. Typically a dose ranging study will include a placebo group of subjects, and a few groups that receive different doses of the test drug. For instance, a typical dose-ranging study may include four groups: a placebo group, low-dose group, medium-dose group and a high-dose group. The maximum tolerable dose (MTD) information is necessary to be able to design such groups and therefore dose-ranging studies are usually designed after the availability of MTD information.

The main goal of a dose-ranging study is to estimate the response vs. dose given, so as to analyze the efficacy and safety of the drug. Although such a response will nevertheless be available from phase III or phase IV trials, it is important to carry out dose-ranging studies in the earlier phase I or phase II stages. There are advantages to using healthy volunteers. They are in a steady-state condition showing no different stages of disease and no variation due to disease. In addition, it is easy to recruit and select volunteers among varying age, sex, race etc. under identical conditions in which the test can be repeated. The main reasons for this is to avoid trials in the later phases using doses that are significantly different from those that will subsequently be recommended for clinical use and also to avoid the need for modification of dosing schedules at later stages where a large amount of data has already been accumulated for a different dose range. The duration of action should be determined during dose-ranging study, as it will allow definition of the dosage schedule. Because it is hard to measure reliable pharmacodynamic parameter, it is difficult to determine the duration of action during early clinical trials. Other parameters instead are suggested as a tentative dosage, such as half-lives in plasma and urine in various test species and human, receptor binding in vitro, or pharmacodynamic data in vivo in animals.
