= MedWatch =

US FDA program for reporting adverse events

MedWatch logo

MedWatch is the Food and Drug Administration’s “Safety Information and Adverse Event Reporting Program.” It interacts with the FDA Adverse Event Reporting System (FAERS or AERS). MedWatch is used for reporting an adverse event or sentinel event. Founded in 1993, this system of voluntary reporting allows such information to be shared with the medical community or the general public. The system includes publicly available databases and online analysis tools for professionals. MedWatch also distributes information on medical recalls and other clinical safety communications via its platforms.

== History ==
MedWatch was founded in 1993 to collect data regarding adverse events in healthcare. An adverse event is any undesirable experience associated with the use of a medical product. The MedWatch system collects reports of adverse reactions and quality problems of drugs and medical devices but also for other FDA-regulated products (such as dietary supplements, cosmetics, medical foods, and infant formulas). As of the summer of 2011, the program had received more than 40,000 adverse event reports.

== Operations ==
Voluntary reporting by healthcare professionals, consumers, and patients is conducted on a single, one-page reporting form (Form FDA 3500). Reporting can be conducted online, by phone, or by submitting the MedWatch 3500 form by mail or fax. In 2013, MedWatch introduced Form 3500B, which is designed to facilitate reporting by healthcare consumers. The MedWatch system is intended to detect safety hazard signals for medical products. If a signal is detected, the FDA can issue medical product safety alerts or order product recalls, withdrawals, or labeling changes to protect the public health. Important safety information is disseminated to the medical community and the general public via the MedWatch web site. and the MedWatch E-list.

Raw data from the MedWatch system, together with adverse drug reaction reports from manufacturers as required by regulation, are part of a public database. Online tools (such as those from eHealthMe) that analyze the database are available for both health care consumers and professionals. The database was used by journalists to investigate FDA's drug approval practice.
