= FDA Adverse Event Reporting System =

US FDA supporting computerized database

The FDA Adverse Event Reporting System (FAERS or AERS) is a computerized information database designed to support the U.S. Food and Drug Administration's (FDA) postmarketing safety surveillance program for all approved drug and therapeutic biologic products. The FDA uses FAERS to monitor for new adverse events and medication errors that might occur with these products. It is a system that measures occasional harms from medications to ascertain whether the risk–benefit ratio is high enough to justify continued use of any particular drug and to identify correctable and preventable problems in health care delivery (such as need for retraining to prevent prescribing errors). The system interacts with several related systems including MedWatch and the Vaccine Adverse Event Reporting System. FAERS replaced legacy AERS system in Sep 2012.

== Background ==
Reporting of adverse events from the point of care is voluntary in the United States. The FDA receives some adverse event and medication error reports directly from health care professionals (such as physicians, pharmacists, nurses and others) and consumers (such as patients, family members, lawyers and others). Health professionals and consumers may also report these events to the products’ manufacturers. If a manufacturer receives an adverse event report, it is required to send the report to the FDA as specified by regulations. The MedWatch site provides information about mandatory reporting.

== Structure ==
The structure of FAERS is in compliance with the international safety reporting guidance (ICH E2B2) issued by the International Conference on Harmonisation. Adverse events in FAERS are coded to terms in the Medical Dictionary for Regulatory Activities terminology (MedDRA)3.

== Uses ==
FAERS is a useful tool for the FDA, which uses it for activities such as looking for new safety concerns that might be related to a marketed product, evaluating a manufacturer's compliance to reporting regulations and responding to outside requests for information. The reports in FAERS are evaluated by clinical reviewers in the Center for Drug Evaluation and Research (CDER) and the Center for Biologics Evaluation and Research (CBER) to monitor the safety of products after they are approved by the FDA. If a potential safety concern is identified in AERS, further evaluation might include Epidemiology studies. Based on an evaluation of the potential safety concern, The FDA may take regulatory action(s) to improve product safety and protect the public health, such as updating a product's labeling information, restricting the use of the drug, communicating new safety information to the public, or, in rare cases, removing a product from the market.

== Limitations ==
AERS data does have limitations. First, there is no certainty that the reported event was actually due to the product. The FDA does not require that a causal relationship between a product and event be proven, and reports do not always contain enough detail to properly evaluate an event. Further, the FDA does not receive all adverse event reports that occur with a product. Many factors can influence whether or not an event will be reported, such as the time a product has been marketed and publicity about an event. Therefore, FAERS cannot be used to calculate the incidence of an adverse event in the U.S. population.

A more reliable medical injury database is kept up-to-date by the Health Resources and Services Administration (HRSA), as claims must first undergo a thorough vetting process before being awarded compensation.

== See also ==
- Vaccine Adverse Event Reporting System (VAERS)

=== External links ===
- FDA Adverse Event Reporting System (FAERS)
- Report an Adverse Event to the FDA
- AdverseEvents.com A summary of the most recently available adverse event data from AERS.
