= Elevated transaminases =

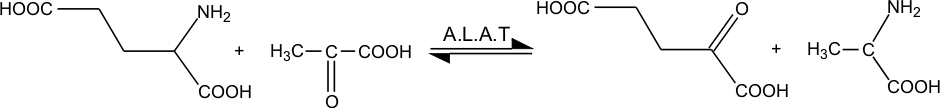
- Alanine transaminase is one of the two transaminases measured (Aspartate transaminase is the other).

In medicine, the presence of elevated transaminases, commonly the transaminases alanine transaminase (ALT) and aspartate transaminase (AST), may be an indicator of liver dysfunction. Other terms include transaminasemia, and elevated liver enzymes (though they are not the only enzymes in the liver). Normal ranges for both ALT and AST vary by gender, age, and geography and are roughly 8-40 U/L (0.14-0.67 μkal/L). Mild transaminesemia refers to levels up to 250 U/L. Drug-induced increases such as that found with the use of anti-tuberculosis agents such as isoniazid are limited typically to below 100 U/L for either ALT or AST. Muscle sources of the enzymes, such as intense exercise, are unrelated to liver function and can markedly increase AST and ALT. Cirrhosis of the liver or fulminant liver failure secondary to hepatitis commonly reach values for both ALT and AST in the >1000 U/L range; however, many people with liver disease have normal transaminases. Elevated transaminases that persist less than six months are termed "acute" in nature, and those values that persist for six months or more are termed "chronic" in nature.

== Pathophysiology ==
The liver has transaminases to synthesize and break down amino acids and to convert energy storage molecules. The concentrations of these transaminases in the serum (the non-cellular portion of blood) are normally low. However, if the liver is damaged, the liver cell (hepatocyte) membrane becomes more permeable and some of the enzymes leak out into the blood circulation.

The two transaminases commonly measured are alanine transaminase (ALT) and aspartate transaminase (AST). These levels previously were called serum glutamate-pyruvate transaminase (SGPT) and serum glutamate-oxaloacetate transaminase (SGOT). Elevated levels are sensitive for liver injury, meaning that they are likely to be present if there is injury. However, they may also be elevated in other conditions such as thyroid disorders, celiac disease, and muscle disorders.

ALT is usually found only in the liver. AST is most commonly found in the liver, but also in significant amounts in heart (cardiac) and skeletal muscle.

Measurement of ALT and AST were used in diagnosing heart attacks, although they have been replaced by newer enzyme and protein tests that are more specific for cardiac damage.

Possible causes for high ALT levels are liver inflammation (hepatitis A, B, C, infectious mononucleosis, acute viral fever, alcohol, pancreatic disorder), injury to muscles (trauma, myocardial infarction, congestive heart failure, acute kidney failure), and many toxins and drugs.

== Role in diagnosis ==
In general, any damage to the liver will cause medium elevations in these transaminases, but diagnosis requires synthesis of many pieces of information, including the patient's history, physical examination, and possibly imaging or other laboratory examinations. However, very high elevations of the transaminases suggests severe liver damage, such as viral hepatitis, liver injury from lack of blood flow, or injury from drugs or toxins. Most disease processes cause ALT to rise higher than AST; AST levels double or triple that of ALT are consistent with alcoholic liver disease.

When the AST is higher than ALT, a muscle source of these enzymes should be considered. For example, muscle inflammation due to dermatomyositis may cause AST>ALT. This is a good reminder that AST and ALT are not good measures of liver function when other sources may influence AST or ALT, because they do not reliably reflect the synthetic ability of the liver, and they may come from tissues other than liver (such as muscle). For example, intense exercise such as weight lifting can increase ALT to 50-200 U/L, and AST to 100-1000 U/L for the week following the exercise.

== Magnitude of AST and ALT elevations ==
The magnitude of AST and ALT elevations vary depending on the cause of the increase, such as intensity of recent muscular exertion or type of hepatocellular injury. The following refer to the "upper reference limit" (URL), also known as the "upper limit of normal" (ULN), which depend on the source and are typically 40-50 U/L (0.67-0.83 μkal/L) for both AST and ALT. While values vary between individuals, the following are typical AST and ALT patterns:

- Alcoholic fatty liver disease: AST > 8 times the URL; ALT > 5 times the URL
- Nonalcoholic fatty liver disease: AST and ALT > 4 times the URL
- Acute viral hepatitis or toxin-related hepatitis with jaundice: AST and ALT > 25 times the URL
- Ischemic hepatopathy (shock liver): AST and ALT > 50 times the URL (in addition the lactate dehydrogenase is often markedly elevated)
- Chronic hepatitis C virus infection: Wide variability, typically normal to less than twice the URL, rarely more than 10 times the URL
- Chronic hepatitis B virus infection: Levels fluctuate; the AST and ALT may be normal, though most patients have mild to moderate elevations (approximately twice the URL); with exacerbations, levels are more than 10 times the URL

== See also ==
- AST/ALT ratio
