= Hydroxyflutamide =

Chemical compound

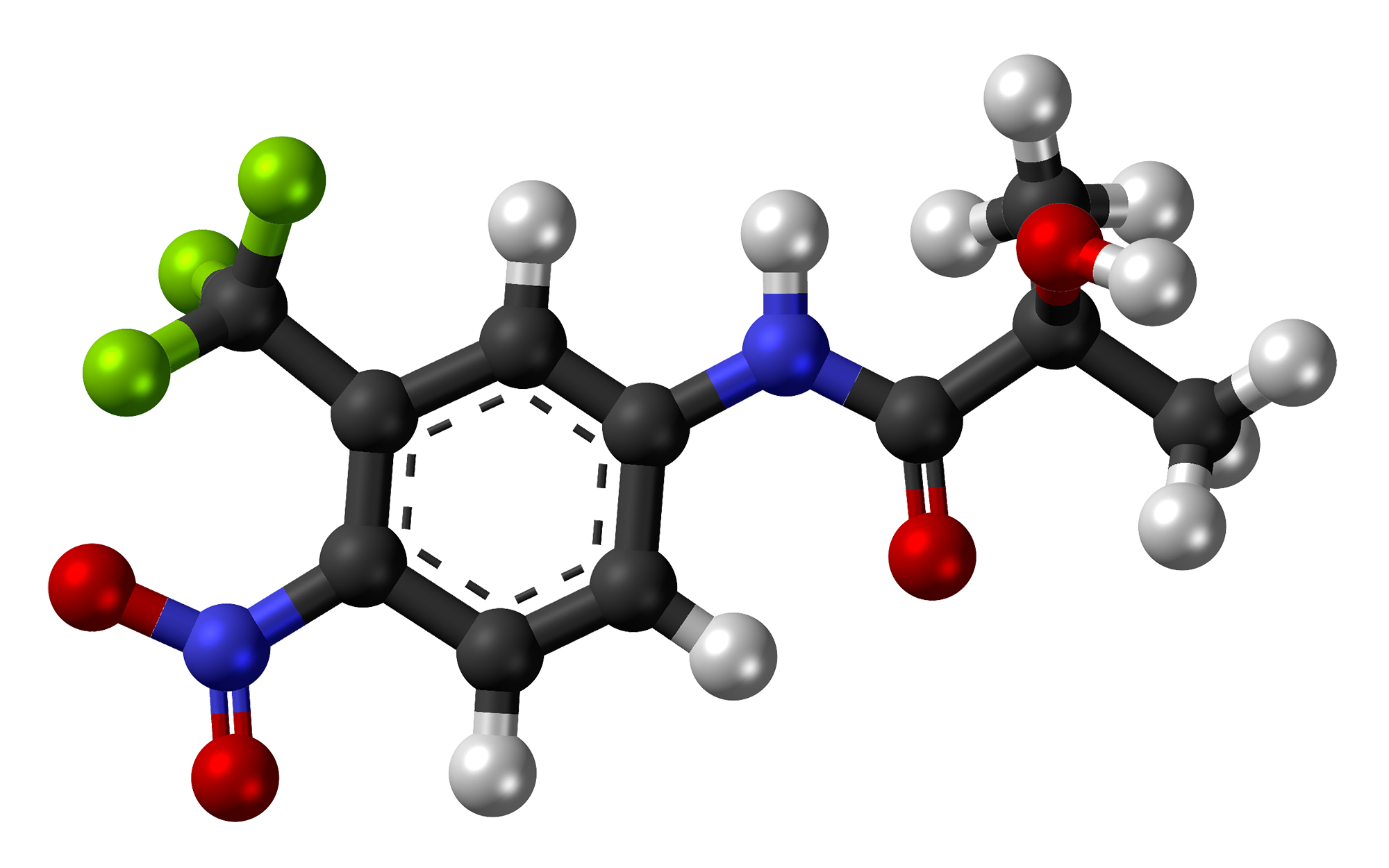

Clinical data
- Other names: 2-Hydroxyflutamide; HF; OHF; Flutamide-hydroxide; SCH-16423; Hydroxyniphtholide; Hydroxyniftolide; α,α,α-Trifluoro-2-methyl-4'-nitro-m-lactotoluidide
- Drug class: Nonsteroidal antiandrogen

Identifiers
- IUPAC name: 2-hydroxy-2-methyl-N-[4-nitro-3-(trifluoromethyl)phenyl]propanamide
- CAS Number: 52806-53-8
- PubChem CID: 91649
- IUPHAR/BPS: 2862
- ChemSpider: 82752
- UNII: 31D90UKP5Y
- KEGG: C14204
- ChEBI: CHEBI:43064
- ChEMBL: ChEMBL491
- CompTox Dashboard (EPA): DTXSID8033562
- ECHA InfoCard: 100.169.708

Chemical and physical data
- Formula: C_{11}H_{11}F_{3}N_{2}O_{4}
- Molar mass: 292.214 g·mol^{−1}
- 3D model (JSmol): Interactive image
- SMILES: CC(C)(C(=O)NC1=CC(=C(C=C1)[N+](=O)[O-])C(F)(F)F)O
- InChI: InChI=1S/C11H11F3N2O4/c1-10(2,18)9(17)15-6-3-4-8(16(19)20)7(5-6)11(12,13)14/h3-5,18H,1-2H3,(H,15,17); Key:YPQLFJODEKMJEF-UHFFFAOYSA-N

Hydroxyflutamide (developmental code SCH-16423; also known as 2-hydroxyflutamide, HF, and OHF) is a nonsteroidal antiandrogen (NSAA) and the major active metabolite of flutamide, which is considered to be a prodrug of hydroxyflutamide as the active form. It has been reported to possess an IC_{50} of 700 nM for the androgen receptor (AR), which is about 4-fold less than that of bicalutamide.

Affinities (Note: At androgen receptors; measured in human prostate tissue.)
Compound	RBA (Note: Relative to Metribolone, which is by definition 100%)
Metribolone	100
Dihydrotestosterone	85
Cyproterone acetate	7.8
Bicalutamide	1.4
Nilutamide	0.9
Hydroxyflutamide	0.57
Flutamide	<0.0057
Notes:

Relative affinities of first-generation nonsteroidal antiandrogens for the androgen receptor
Species	IC_{50} (nM)			RBA (ratio)		
Species	Bicalutamide	2-Hydroxyflutamide	Nilutamide	Bica / 2-OH-flu	Bica / nilu	Ref
Rat	190	700	ND	4.0	ND	
Rat	~400	~900	~900	2.3	2.3	
Rat	ND	ND	ND	3.3	ND	
Rat^{a}	3595	4565	18620	1.3	5.2	
Human	~300	~700	~500	2.5	1.6	
Human	~100	~300	ND	~3.0	ND	
Human^{a}	2490	2345	5300	1.0	2.1	
Footnotes: ^{a} = Controversial data. Sources: See template.

Relative potencies of selected antiandrogens
Antiandrogen	Relative potency
Bicalutamide	4.3
Hydroxyflutamide	3.5
Flutamide	3.3
Cyproterone acetate	1.0
Zanoterone	0.4
Description: Relative potencies of orally administered antiandrogens in antagonizing 0.8 to 1.0 mg/kg s.c. testosterone propionate-induced ventral prostate weight increase in castrated immature male rats. Higher values mean greater potency. Sources: See template.
