= Mitochondrial toxicity =

Mitochondrial toxicity is a condition in which the mitochondria of a body's cells become damaged or decline significantly in number; it occurs as a side effect of certain antiretroviral drugs used to treat human immunodeficiency virus, or HIV.

== Causes ==
While the exact causes of mitochondrial toxicity are unknown, research has shown that a certain group of anti-viral drugs used to treat HIV, specifically nucleoside analog reverse transcriptase inhibitors (NRTIs), interfere with an enzyme needed in the production of mitochondria.

== Symptoms ==
The disruption of cell function that accompanies the condition can cause both mild and severe problems in people with mitochondrial toxicity. The most commonly observed symptom is muscle weakness, or myopathy. Others include peripheral neuropathy (numbness in the fingers and toes) and pancreatitis (inflammation of the pancreas), with the most severe being lactic acidosis, in which a build-up of lactic acid in the tissues of the body leads to loss of energy, organ failure, and eventually death.

== See also ==
- Category:Respiratory toxins
- Uncoupler
