= Maximum androgen blockade =

Maximum or maximal androgen blockade (MAB) or complete or combined androgen blockade (CAB) is a medical treatment involving the combination of both androgen receptor (AR) antagonism and inhibition or suppression of androgen production to attain maximal effectiveness in androgen deprivation therapy (ADT). An example of MAB is the combination of bicalutamide, an AR antagonist, with a gonadotropin-releasing hormone (GnRH) analogue such as leuprorelin or cetrorelix. MAB was developed for and is employed in the treatment of prostate cancer.

Triple androgen blockade (TrAB) is a method of ADT in which a 5α-reductase inhibitor such as finasteride or dutasteride is added to CAB.

MAB has been found to produce higher rates of gynecomastia (7 to 28%) than orchiectomy and GnRH analogues alone (1 to 16%), but lower rates than nonsteroidal antiandrogen monotherapy such as with bicalutamide (30 to 85%).
