= Medical uses of bicalutamide =

The medical uses of bicalutamide, a nonsteroidal antiandrogen (NSAA), include the treatment of androgen-dependent conditions and hormone therapy to block the effects of androgens. Indications for bicalutamide include the treatment of prostate cancer in men, skin and hair conditions such as acne, seborrhea, hirsutism, and pattern hair loss in women, high testosterone levels in women, hormone therapy in transgender women, as a puberty blocker to prevent puberty in transgender girls and to treat early puberty in boys, and the treatment of long-lasting erections in men. It may also have some value in the treatment of paraphilias and hypersexuality in men.

== Prostate cancer ==
Bicalutamide is used primarily in the treatment of early and advanced prostate cancer. It is approved at a dosage of 50 mg/day as a combination therapy with a gonadotropin-releasing hormone analogue (GnRH analogue) or orchiectomy (that is, surgical or medical castration) in the treatment of stage D2 metastatic prostate cancer (mPC), and as a monotherapy at a dosage of 150 mg/day for the treatment of stage C or D1 locally advanced prostate cancer (LAPC). Although effective in mPC and LAPC, bicalutamide is no longer indicated for the treatment of localized prostate cancer (LPC) due to negative findings in the Early Prostate Cancer (EPC) clinical trial programme. Prior to the introduction of the newer NSAA enzalutamide in 2012, bicalutamide was considered to be the standard-of-care antiandrogen in the treatment of prostate cancer, and still remains widely used for this indication. Compared to earlier antiandrogens like the steroidal antiandrogen (SAA) cyproterone acetate (CPA) and the NSAAs flutamide and nilutamide, bicalutamide shows an improved profile of effectiveness, tolerability, and safety, and for this reason has largely replaced them in the treatment of prostate cancer.

In the early 1940s, it was discovered that growth of prostate cancer in men regressed with surgical castration or high-dose estrogen therapy, which produced very low levels of circulating testosterone, and accelerated with the administration of exogenous testosterone. It has since been elucidated that androgens like testosterone and dihydrotestosterone (DHT) function as trophic factors for the prostate gland, stimulating cell division and proliferation and producing tissue growth and glandular enlargement, which, in the context of prostate cancer, results in stimulation of tumors and a considerable acceleration of disease progression. As a result of these discoveries, androgen deprivation therapy (ADT), via a variety of modalities including surgical castration, high-dose estrogens, SAAs, GnRH analogues, NSAAs, and androgen biosynthesis inhibitors (e.g., abiraterone acetate), has become the mainstay of treatment for prostate cancer. Although ADT can shrink or stabilize prostate tumors and hence significantly slow the course of prostate cancer and prolong life, it is not generally curative. While effective in slowing the progression of the disease initially, most advanced prostate cancer patients eventually become resistant to ADT and prostate cancer growth starts to accelerate again, in part due to progressive mutations in the androgen receptor (AR) that result in the transformation of drugs like bicalutamide from AR antagonists to agonists.

A few observations form the basis of the reasoning behind combined androgen blockade (CAB), in which castration and an NSAA are combined. It has been found that very low levels of androgens, as in castration, are able to significantly stimulate growth of prostate cancer cells and accelerate disease progression. Although castration ceases production of androgens by the gonads and reduces circulating testosterone levels by about 95%, low levels of androgens continue to be produced by the adrenal glands, and this accounts for the residual levels of circulating testosterone. Moreover, it has been found that prostate gland levels of DHT, which is the major androgen in the prostate, remain at 40 to 50% of their initial values following castration. This has been determined to be due to uptake of circulating weak adrenal androgens like dehydroepiandrosterone (DHEA) and androstenedione (A4) by the prostate and their de novo transformation into testosterone and DHT. As such, a considerable amount of androgen signaling continues within the prostate gland even with castration.

In the past, surgical adrenalectomy and early androgen biosynthesis inhibitors like ketoconazole and aminoglutethimide were successfully employed in the treatment of castration-resistant prostate cancer. However, adrenalectomy is an invasive procedure with high morbidity, ketoconazole and aminoglutethimide have relatively high toxicity, and both treatment modalities require supplementation with corticosteroids, making them in many ways unideal. The development of CAB with NSAAs like bicalutamide and enzalutamide and with newer and more tolerable androgen biosynthesis inhibitors like abiraterone acetate has since allowed for non-invasive, convenient, and well-tolerated therapies that have replaced the earlier modalities.

Subsequent clinical research has found that monotherapy with higher dosages of NSAAs than those used in CAB is roughly equivalent to castration in extending life in men with prostate cancer. Moreover, NSAA monotherapy is overall better tolerated and associated with greater quality of life than is castration, which is thought to be related to the fact that testosterone levels do not decrease with NSAA monotherapy and hence by extension that levels of biologically active and beneficial metabolites of testosterone such as estrogens and neurosteroids are preserved. For these reasons, NSAA monotherapy has become an important alternative to castration and CAB in the treatment of prostate cancer.

Bicalutamide may be used to reduce the effects of the testosterone flare at the initiation of GnRH agonist therapy.

The combination of bicalutamide with an estrogen such as ethinylestradiol sulfonate has been used as a form of CAB and as an alternative to the combination of bicalutamide with surgical or medical castration.

== Skin and hair conditions ==
Androgens like testosterone and DHT play a critical role in the pathogenesis of a number of dermatological conditions including acne, seborrhea, hirsutism (excessive facial/body hair growth in women), and pattern hair loss (androgenic alopecia). In demonstration of this, women with complete androgen insensitivity syndrome (CAIS) do not produce sebum or develop acne and have little to no body, pubic, or axillary hair. Moreover, men with congenital 5α-reductase type II deficiency, 5α-reductase being an enzyme that greatly potentiates the androgenic effects of testosterone in the skin, have little to no acne, scanty facial hair, reduced body hair, and reportedly no incidence of male pattern hair loss. Conversely, hyperandrogenism in women, for instance due to polyendocrine metabolic ovarian syndrome (PMOS) or congenital adrenal hyperplasia (CAH), is commonly associated with acne and hirsutism as well as virilization (masculinization) in general. In accordance with the preceding, antiandrogens have been found to be highly effective in the treatment of the aforementioned androgen-dependent skin and hair conditions.

Improvement in scalp hair density in a 37-year-old woman treated with 25 mg/day bicalutamide monotherapy. Left is before treatment and right is after 6 months of therapy.

Low-dose bicalutamide has been found to be effective in the treatment of hirsutism in women in clinical studies. In one of the studies, the medication was well tolerated, all of the patients experienced a visible increase in hair density, and a highly significant clinical improvement was observed with the Ferriman–Gallwey score decreasing by 41.2% at 3 months and by 61.6% at 6 months (from 22.0 ± 5.1 to 8.6 ± 3.5). According to a 2013 review, "Low dose bicalutamide (25 mg/day) was shown to be effective in the treatment of hirsutism related to IH and PMOS. It does not have any significant side effects [or lead] to irregular periods." In 2017, the combination of bicalutamide with a combined birth control pill was evaluated in a phase III clinical trial for the treatment of severe hirsutism in women with PMOS, and was found to be significantly more effective than a combined birth control pill alone. In addition, bicalutamide was shown to be safe and to produce no side effects, except for a significant increase in total cholesterol and low-density lipoprotein levels. Studies have reported bicalutamide to be effective in the treatment of scalp hair loss in women.

In addition to hirsutism, bicalutamide can be used in the treatment of acne in women. Flutamide has generally been found to reduce symptoms of acne by 80 or 90% even at low doses, with several studies showing complete acne clearance. In one study, it decreased acne scores by 80% within 3 months, whereas the SAA spironolactone decreased symptoms by only 40% in the same time period. Bicalutamide has an antiandrogenic efficacy that is comparable to or greater than that of flutamide, and would be expected to produce similar therapeutic benefits. Other androgen-dependent skin and hair conditions, such as seborrhea and pattern hair loss, may also be treated by bicalutamide. In addition to acne, flutamide has been found to produce an 80% or greater decrease in scores of seborrhea and androgen-dependent scalp hair loss. Moreover, in combination with a combined birth control pill, flutamide treatment resulted in an increase in cosmetically acceptable scalp hair density in almost all women suffering from pattern hair loss in one small study. Bicalutamide is an appealing alternative to flutamide for the treatment of androgen-dependent skin and hair conditions in women because flutamide has a considerable risk of serious liver toxicity, which bicalutamide does not share.

Antiandrogens like flutamide and bicalutamide are male-specific teratogens which can feminize male fetuses due to their antiandrogen effects. For this reason, they are not recommended by the U.S. Food and Drug Administration for use in women. Because of this risk, it is strongly recommended that antiandrogens only be used to treat women who are of reproductive age in conjunction with adequate contraception. Birth control pills, which contain an estrogen and a progestin, are typically used for this purpose. Moreover, birth control pills themselves are functional antiandrogens and are independently effective in the treatment of androgen-dependent skin and hair conditions; hence, they can significantly augment the effectiveness of antiandrogens in the treatment of such conditions.

== Transgender hormone therapy ==
Bicalutamide is used as an antiandrogen in feminizing hormone therapy for transgender women and as a puberty blocker in adolescent transgender girls. It can be used in transgender females both in combination with an estrogen and alone. The medication directly blocks the effects of androgens like testosterone and dihydrotestosterone in the body, and, when used by itself, also induces a significant increase in estradiol levels. As a result, bicalutamide causes demasculinization, and can additionally promote feminization, even without concomitant use of estrogen. This is analogous to what occurs in women with a defective AR due to complete androgen insensitivity syndrome. Demasculinizing and feminizing effects of bicalutamide in those assigned male at birth include breast development, reduced male-pattern hair, decreased muscle mass, feminine changes in fat distribution, decreased sex drive, and reduced spontaneous erections. Dosages of bicalutamide of 25 to 50 mg/day have been used and recommended in transgender females. Lower doses may also be effective.

Unlike various other antiandrogens, bicalutamide when used as a monotherapy significantly increases testosterone and estradiol levels in individuals assigned male at birth, and hence can have indirect estrogenic effects in transgender women. This is desirable in transgender women, as it can help promote feminization. However, bicalutamide does not increase sex hormone levels if combined with adequate doses of an antigonadotropin such as a GnRH modulator, estrogen, or progestogen, due to the negative feedback effects of these medications on sex-hormone production. Because bicalutamide does not lower androgen levels, it may be a particularly favorable antiandrogen for transgender women who wish to help preserve sex drive, sexual function, and/or fertility, as antiandrogens that strongly suppress levels of testosterone and its metabolites, such as CPA and GnRH modulators, can greatly disrupt these functions. Although bicalutamide has the potential to increase testosterone levels, there is no effect of this testosterone due to the blockade of the AR by bicalutamide.

Neyman and colleagues in 2019 published a study on bicalutamide as a puberty blocker in adolescent transgender girls. It was employed both alone (n=17) and in combination with estrogen (n=6) at a dose of 50 mg/day in 23 transgender girls (mean age of 16 years, range 12 to 18.4 years) between 2013 and 2018. Of the girls who were treated exclusively with bicalutamide alone, 13 returned for follow-up and were analyzed. In addition to apparently showing effectiveness as an antiandrogen and puberty blocker, bicalutamide alone increased estradiol levels and promoted feminization as a secondary effect. This included breast development to Tanner stages 2 to 5 in 85% of the patients at the first follow-up visit at 6.3 months of treatment. Of the two who did not show breast development, one had only been on bicalutamide for 2 months and the other progressed to Tanner stage 3 at the second follow-up at 12.5 months after starting bicalutamide. Testosterone levels (n=5) were 524 to 823 ng/dL and estradiol levels (n=6) were <20 to 61 pg/mL in the patients. Liver function tests were performed and were all normal. Although GnRH modulators are the first-line treatment to prevent puberty in transgender adolescents, they are very expensive and are often denied by medical insurance. According to the researchers, bicalutamide represents a potential alternative to GnRH modulators as a puberty blocker in transgender girls.

Studies assessing bicalutamide as an antiandrogen in transgender women are very limited. In any case, besides the study of bicalutamide as a puberty blocker in transgender girls, it has been found to be effective as an antiandrogen in women with hirsutism due to hyperandrogenism and in boys with gonadotropin-independent precocious puberty, and demasculinization and feminization are well-documented effects of bicalutamide in men treated with it for prostate cancer. In addition, nilutamide, a closely related antiandrogen with the same mechanism of action as bicalutamide, has been evaluated in transgender women in at least five small published clinical studies by the same group of researchers. It was given at a relatively high dosage of 300 mg/day, the same dosage at which it has been used as a monotherapy in the treatment of prostate cancer. The corresponding monotherapy dosage of bicalutamide in the treatment of prostate cancer is 150 mg/day. Flutamide has also been employed as an antiandrogen in transgender women, with at least two treatment centers at one point reporting its frequent use.

In the studies of nilutamide for transgender hormone therapy, the medication, given alone and not in combination with estrogen, induced observable signs of feminization in young transgender women (ages 19–33 years) within 8 weeks. These changes included breast development, decreased male-pattern hair, decreased spontaneous erections and sex drive, and positive psychological and emotional changes. Signs of breast development, such as increased nipple sensitivity, were, along with decreased male-pattern hair, the earliest indications of feminization, and occurred in all subjects within 6 weeks. Nilutamide by itself more than doubled luteinizing hormone (LH) and testosterone levels and tripled estradiol levels. The addition of 100 μg/day oral ethinylestradiol to nilutamide therapy after 8 weeks abolished the increase in LH, testosterone, and estradiol levels and dramatically suppressed testosterone levels, into the female or castrate range. On the basis of these results, both nilutamide alone, and particularly the combination of nilutamide and estrogen, were regarded as effective for producing antiandrogenic effects and feminization in transgender women.

Although nilutamide has been found to be effective for transgender hormone therapy, the use of nilutamide in the treatment of prostate cancer, and particularly for other indications that are of a less clinically serious nature, is now discouraged due to the unique adverse effects of the medication, most importantly a high incidence of interstitial pneumonitis. This is an adverse effect that can progress to pulmonary fibrosis and can potentially be fatal. Flutamide is also no longer recommended due to excessive risk of hepatotoxicity and liver failure in men with prostate cancer. For these reasons, newer and safer NSAAs like bicalutamide have largely replaced flutamide and nilutamide, and are now used for relevant indications instead. As selective AR antagonists, flutamide, nilutamide, and bicalutamide have the same mechanism of action, and bicalutamide has similar or greater efficacy to flutamide and nilutamide as an antiandrogen.

Bicalutamide is known to have a small risk of elevated liver enzymes and serious liver toxicity. As a result, it is recommended that liver function tests (LFTs) periodically be performed. One protocol that has been recommended is to check LFTs at baseline, at one month, at two months, and then every 6 months thereafter. The risk of elevated liver enzymes and liver failure with bicalutamide appears to be much smaller than with high doses of CPA, which is the most widely used antiandrogen in transgender women in Europe and elsewhere in the world. However, only low doses of CPA are now recommended for use in transgender women. In the United States, one of the only countries where CPA has not been approved for medical use, spironolactone is commonly used in transgender women instead. Bicalutamide has certain favorable properties as a potential alternative option to these antiandrogens in transgender females. For example, it is much more potent and selective as an AR antagonist than CPA and spironolactone. However, CPA may be a more potent antiandrogen than bicalutamide in the context of male levels of testosterone, due to its additional action of substantially suppressing testosterone levels at low doses. In transgender women who do not achieve their desired results or are unable to tolerate the side effects of other antiandrogens, switching to bicalutamide may be useful.

The World Professional Association for Transgender Health (WPATH) Standards of Care for the Health of Transgender and Gender Diverse People Version 8 (SOC8), released in September 2022, recommends against the routine use of bicalutamide in transfeminine people due to lack of study and data on it in this population and safety concerns such as liver toxicity. Instead, the SOC8 recommends other more established and better-studied antiandrogens, like spironolactone, CPA, and GnRH modulators. Other less prominent transgender health guidelines are mixed in recommending against use of bicalutamide (UCSF guidelines), cautiously allowing it (Fenway Health guidelines), and recommending it over other antiandrogens (Southern African HIV Clinicians' Society guidelines).

== Male early puberty ==
Bicalutamide is used in combination with an aromatase inhibitor such as anastrozole or letrozole in the treatment of peripheral precocious puberty in young boys. The combination has specifically been used to treat male peripheral precocious puberty due to familial male-limited precocious puberty (FMPP, otherwise known as testotoxicosis) and, to a lesser extent, McCune–Albright syndrome. Whereas antigonadotropic medications such as GnRH modulators and progestogens like cyproterone acetate and medroxyprogesterone acetate are normally used to treat central precocious puberty, these medications are less or not at all effective in peripheral precocious puberty, as this type of precocious puberty is independent of gonadotropin secretion. Instead, androgens and estrogens must be more directly inhibited in peripheral precocious puberty via the use of sex-hormone receptor antagonists and synthesis inhibitors. A dosage of bicalutamide of 2 mg/kg (or about 40 to 60 mg in boys that are 20 to 30 kg or 45 to 65 lbs) once daily is recommended for use in male peripheral precocious puberty. Bicalutamide is used to block the actions of androgens in the condition, while the aromatase inhibitor is used to decrease levels of estrogens. The goal of treatment is to prevent further development of secondary sexual characteristics, and particularly to slow the rate of growth and improve final adult height.

Due to the rare nature of peripheral precocious puberty, medications used in the treatment of the condition have only been studied limitedly in small numbers of patients. The largest and sole study employing bicalutamide, an industry-sponsored, phase II, multicenter, international, open-label, single-arm clinical trial known as the Bicalutamide and Anastrozole Treatment of Testotoxicosis (BATT) study, assessed the combination of 12.5 to 100 mg/day bicalutamide and 0.5 to 1 mg/day anastrozole over a period of 12 months in 14 young boys with FMPP. The mean age of the boys was 4 ± 2 years, with a range of 2 to 9 years of age. At baseline, the boys weighed 23 ± 6 kg (52 ± 12 lbs) on average, with a range 17 to 35 kg (37 to 77 lbs). Mean total levels of testosterone in the boys were 277 ± 208 ng/dL at baseline and increased to 523 ± 258 ng/dL at 6 months and 427 ± 243 ng/dL at 12 months. Mean total levels of estradiol in the boys were 3.8 pg/mL at baseline and were relatively unchanged at 6 and 12 months (2.5 pg/mL and 3.5 pg/mL, respectively). The dosage of bicalutamide was initiated at 12.5 mg/day and was then increased, with adjustment as necessary to maintain trough circulating (R)-bicalutamide concentrations within a target range of 5 to 15 μg/mL. This range is similar to (R)-bicalutamide levels achieved with approximately 30 to 100 mg/day bicalutamide in adult men with prostate cancer. The mean final dosage of bicalutamide in the boys at 12 months was 60 ± 29 mg/day, with 86% of the boys on either 50 or 100 mg/day bicalutamide. Levels of (R)-bicalutamide were proportional to dosage and did not appear to be related to the age or weight of the boys.

In the BATT trial, growth velocity was decreased, bone age advancement was slowed, aggressiveness was decreased, and masculinization, measured via Tanner staging of pubic hair and genitals, did not appear to further progress. However, the decrease in growth rate was modest and fell just short of reaching statistical significance (p = 0.053). Conversely, although the decrease in rate of bone maturation was described as modest similarly, the ratio of bone age to chronological age was significantly reduced (p < 0.0001). Linear growth and skeletal maturation during normal puberty is mainly due to estradiol and not testosterone in both boys and girls, and hence inhibition of these processes with the combination of bicalutamide and anastrozole in precocious puberty would in theory be mostly dependent on the aromatase inhibitor rather than on bicalutamide. Testicular volume increased mildly over the year that the boys were observed. A New Drug Application of bicalutamide for FMPP in the United States was submitted on the basis of the BATT trial data. However, the application was not approved by the Food and Drug Administration, which cited insufficient evidence of effectiveness. Although indication of bicalutamide for the use was not granted, the bicalutamide medication label was updated to include the findings of the study. In terms of side effects, the combination of bicalutamide and anastrozole in the study was described as well tolerated with no safety concerns. However, gynecomastia, attributed to bicalutamide, was observed in almost half of the boys. In addition, one case of mildly elevated liver enzymes (1 of 14; 7%), possibly related to bicalutamide, was observed but resolved spontaneously without discontinuation of therapy.

Additional research is necessary to more clearly determine the true effectiveness and safety of bicalutamide and anastrozole in the treatment of FMPP. No long-term results for the BATT study have been published as of yet, but a 5-year follow-up of two of the boys in the study was published and reported continued effectiveness. It is intended that the study will continue until all of the boys reach adult final height, with an additional publication planned in the future. In addition to the BATT study, a variety of case reports and series of bicalutamide in combination with an aromatase inhibitor in male peripheral precocious puberty have been published. These case reports have described similar results as those of the BATT study.

Alternatives to bicalutamide in the treatment of male peripheral precocious puberty include spironolactone, cyproterone acetate, and ketoconazole. Bicalutamide with anastrozole is considered to be superior to the combination of spironolactone and testolactone in peripheral precocious puberty, with greater efficacy and fewer side effects. This corresponds to the fact that bicalutamide is a much more potent and selective antiandrogen than spironolactone. Additionally, dosing is easier with bicalutamide, as it requires administration only once daily as opposed to twice daily at 12-hour intervals with spironolactone. For these reasons, bicalutamide has replaced spironolactone in the treatment of the condition. For comparison to bicalutamide, a higher dosage of spironolactone of 5 mg/kg (or about 100 to 150 mg in boys that are 20 to 30 kg or 45 to 65 lbs) once daily is recommended for use in male peripheral precocious puberty.

== Long-lasting erections ==
Antiandrogens can considerably relieve and prevent priapism (potentially painful penile erections that last more than four hours) via direct blockade of penile ARs. In accordance, bicalutamide, at low dosages (50 mg every other day or as little as once or twice weekly), has been found in a series of case reports to completely resolve recurrent priapism in men without producing significant side effects, and is used for this indication off-label. In the reported cases, libido, rigid erections, the potential for sexual intercourse, orgasm, and subjective ejaculatory volume have all remained intact or unchanged, and gynecomastia has not developed when bicalutamide is administered at a total dosage of 25 mg/day or less. Some gynecomastia and breast tenderness developed in one patient treated with 50 mg/day, but significantly improved upon the dosage being halved. The observed tolerability profile of bicalutamide in these subjects has been regarded as significantly more favorable than that of GnRH analogues and estrogens (which are also used in the treatment of this condition). However, although successful and well tolerated, very few cases have been reported. Despite the apparent efficacy of bicalutamide for priapism, a small clinical study found that bicalutamide monotherapy at a dosage of 50 mg/day had no effect on nocturnal erections in men with prostate cancer.

== Sexual deviance ==
The antigonadotropic antiandrogens CPA, medroxyprogesterone acetate (MPA), and GnRH analogues have all been widely used to treat paraphilias (e.g., pedophilia) and hypersexuality in men. They suppress androgen levels to castrate or near-castrate levels and are highly effective in reducing sexual urges, arousal, and behaviors. In addition, they are used to treat sex offenders as a means of chemical castration for the purpose of reducing the likelihood of recidivism.

Although they have not been studied in the treatment of paraphilias and hypersexuality, NSAAs like flutamide and bicalutamide have been suggested as potential medications for these indications and may have superior tolerability and safety relative to antigonadotropic antiandrogens. As an example, because NSAAs do not reduce estrogen levels, unlike antigonadotropic antiandrogens, they preserve bone mineral density (BMD) and have little or no risk of osteoporosis and associated bone fractures. However, due to unopposed estrogen signaling, a substantial incidence of gynecomastia is associated with NSAAs. In addition to potential monotherapy use, NSAAs have been advocated for temporarily suppressing sex drive during the start of GnRH agonist treatment via prevention of the increased androgen signaling associated with the initial testosterone flare.

Though treatment of paraphilias and hypersexuality with selective AR antagonists is a seemingly sound strategy, this may not be true in practice. Surprisingly, little or no sexual dysfunction, including loss of sex drive and decreased sexual activity, has been observed in clinical studies of NSAA monotherapy. The explanation for this is that NSAAs do not lower androgen levels, and metabolites of testosterone like estrogens and neurosteroids may be of critical importance for maintenance of sex drive and function in males. In accordance, testosterone is locally aromatized into estradiol widely throughout the brain and estradiol appears to be the mediator of many of the central actions of testosterone. For these reasons, unlike antigonadotropic antiandrogens, NSAA monotherapy may have limited usefulness in the management of paraphilias and hypersexuality. The addition of NSAAs to antigonadotropic antiandrogens like GnRH analogues may have some usefulness however, particularly in severe cases. In any case, insufficient evidence is available at this time, and further research is thus warranted.
