= Comparison of bicalutamide with other antiandrogens =

Comparison of the nonsteroidal antiandrogen (NSAA) bicalutamide with other antiandrogens reveals differences between the medications in terms of efficacy, tolerability, safety, and other parameters. Relative to the other first-generation NSAAs, flutamide and nilutamide, bicalutamide shows improved potency, efficacy, tolerability, and safety, and has largely replaced these medications in clinical practice. Compared to the second-generation NSAAs, enzalutamide and apalutamide, bicalutamide has inferior potency and efficacy but similar tolerability and safety and a lower propensity for drug interactions.

Relative to steroidal antiandrogens like cyproterone acetate and spironolactone, bicalutamide has better selectivity in its action, superior efficacy as an antagonist of the androgen receptor, and better tolerability. Bicalutamide also shows a better safety profile than cyproterone acetate. When used as a high-dosage monotherapy, bicalutamide shows slightly inferior effectiveness in the treatment of prostate cancer compared to castration and GnRH analogues but a different and potentially superior tolerability and safety profile. Unlike antigonadotropic antiandrogens like cyproterone acetate and GnRH analogues, bicalutamide does not suppress production of testosterone or estradiol and instead actually increases it, which has an important involvement in the differential side-effect profiles of the medications.

== Overview ==
Bicalutamide and the other nonsteroidal antiandrogens (NSAAs), since their introduction, have largely replaced cyproterone acetate (CPA), an older drug and steroidal antiandrogen (SAA), in the treatment of prostate cancer. Bicalutamide was the third NSAA to be marketed, with flutamide and nilutamide preceding, and followed by enzalutamide. Relative to the earlier antiandrogens, bicalutamide has substantially reduced toxicity, and in contrast to them, is said to have an excellent and favorable safety profile. For these reasons, as well as superior potency, tolerability, and pharmacokinetics, bicalutamide is preferred and has largely replaced flutamide and nilutamide in clinical practice. In accordance, bicalutamide is the most widely used antiandrogen in the treatment of prostate cancer. Between January 2007 and December 2009, it accounted in the U.S. for about 87.2% of NSAA prescriptions. Prior to the 2012 approval of enzalutamide, a newer and improved NSAA with greater potency and efficacy, bicalutamide was regarded as the standard-of-care antiandrogen in the treatment of the prostate cancer.

== First-generation NSAAs ==
Comparison of first-generation NSAAs
Property	Flutamide	Nilutamide	Bicalutamide
Half-life	5–6 hours	~2 days	~7 days
AR RBA	25%	20%	100%
Dosage	250 mg t.i.d.	100 mg t.i.d.	150 mg o.d.
Unique side effects/risks	• Diarrhea • Hepatotoxicity • Photosensitivity	• Nausea and vomiting • Visual disturbances • Alcohol intolerance • Interstitial pneumonitis	• None

Relative potencies of selected antiandrogens
Antiandrogen	Relative potency
Bicalutamide	4.3
Hydroxyflutamide	3.5
Flutamide	3.3
Cyproterone acetate	1.0
Zanoterone	0.4
Description: Relative potencies of orally administered antiandrogens in antagonizing 0.8 to 1.0 mg/kg s.c. testosterone propionate-induced ventral prostate weight increase in castrated immature male rats. Higher values mean greater potency. Sources: See template.

Flutamide and nilutamide are first-generation NSAAs, similarly to bicalutamide, and all three drugs possess the same core mechanism of action of being selective AR antagonists. However, bicalutamide is the most potent of the three, with the highest affinity for the AR and the longest elimination half-life, and is the safest, least toxic, and best-tolerated. For these reasons, bicalutamide has largely replaced flutamide and nilutamide in clinical use, and is by far the most widely used first-generation NSAA.

=== Effectiveness ===
In terms of binding to the AR, the active (R)-enantiomer of bicalutamide has 4-fold greater affinity relative to that of hydroxyflutamide, the active metabolite of flutamide (a prodrug), and 5-fold higher affinity relative to that of nilutamide. In addition, bicalutamide possesses the longest elimination half-life of the three drugs, with half-lives of 6–10 days for bicalutamide, 5–6 hours for flutamide and 8–9 hours for hydroxyflutamide, and 23–87 hours (mean 56 hours) for nilutamide. Due to the relatively short half-lives of flutamide and hydroxyflutamide, flutamide must be taken three times daily at 8-hour intervals, whereas bicalutamide and nilutamide may be taken once daily. For this reason, dosing of bicalutamide (and nilutamide) is more convenient than with flutamide. The greater AR affinity and longer elimination half-life of bicalutamide allow it to be used at relatively low dosages in comparison to flutamide (750–1500 mg/day) and nilutamide (150–300 mg/day) in the treatment of prostate cancer.

While it has not been directly compared to nilutamide, the effectiveness of bicalutamide has been found to be at least equivalent to that of flutamide in the treatment of prostate cancer in a direct head-to-head comparison. Moreover, indications of superior efficacy, including significantly greater relative decreases and increases in levels of prostate-specific antigen (PSA) and testosterone, respectively, were observed.

Relative affinities of first-generation nonsteroidal antiandrogens for the androgen receptor
Species	IC_{50} (nM)			RBA (ratio)		
Species	Bicalutamide	2-Hydroxyflutamide	Nilutamide	Bica / 2-OH-flu	Bica / nilu	Ref
Rat	190	700	ND	4.0	ND	
Rat	~400	~900	~900	2.3	2.3	
Rat	ND	ND	ND	3.3	ND	
Rat^{a}	3595	4565	18620	1.3	5.2	
Human	~300	~700	~500	2.5	1.6	
Human	~100	~300	ND	~3.0	ND	
Human^{a}	2490	2345	5300	1.0	2.1	
Footnotes: ^{a} = Controversial data. Sources: See template.

=== Tolerability and safety ===
Comparative tolerability of NSAAs
Side effect	Flut	Nilu	Bica	Enza
Gynecomastia	+++	+++	+++	++
Breast pain	+++	+++	+++	++
Hot flashes	++	–	+	+
Fatigue	–	–	+	++
Nausea	+	++	–	+
Diarrhea	++	–	+	+
Constipation	–	–	+	+
Back pain	–	–	+	+
Visual disturbances	–	++	–	–
Alcohol intolerance	–	+	–	–
Hypertension	–	–	–	+
Seizures	–	–	–	+
Hepatotoxicity	+	–	–	–
Key: –: Not reported; +: ≥ 1%, < 20%; ++: ≥ 20%, < 40%; +++: ≥ 40%. Sources:

The core side effects of NSAAs such as gynecomastia, sexual dysfunction, and hot flashes occur at similar rates with the different drugs. Conversely, bicalutamide is associated with a significantly lower rate of diarrhea compared to flutamide. In fact, the incidence of diarrhea did not differ between the bicalutamide and placebo groups (6.3% vs. 6.4%, respectively) in the Early Prostate Cancer (EPC) clinical trial programme, whereas diarrhea occurs in up to 20% of patients treated with flutamide. The rate of nausea and vomiting appears to be lower with bicalutamide and flutamide than with nilutamide (approximately 30% incidence of nausea with nilutamide, usually rated as mild-to-moderate). In addition, bicalutamide (and flutamide) is not associated with alcohol intolerance, visual disturbances, or a high rate of interstitial pneumonitis. In terms of toxicity and rare reactions, as described above, bicalutamide appears to have the lowest relative risks of hepatotoxicity and interstitial pneumonitis, with respective incidences far below those of flutamide and nilutamide. In contrast to flutamide and nilutamide, no unique or specific complications have been linked to bicalutamide.

Side effects of combined androgen blockade with nonsteroidal antiandrogens
Side effect	Bicalutamide 50 mg/day + GnRH agonist (n = 401) (%)^{a,b}	Flutamide 750 mg/day^{c} + GnRH agonist (n = 407) (%)^{a,b}
Hot flashes	52.6	53.3
Pain (general)	35.4	31.2
Back pain	25.4	25.8
Asthenia	22.2	21.4
Constipation	21.7	17.0
Pelvic pain	21.2	17.2
Infection	17.7	14.0
Nausea	14.0	13.6
Peripheral edema	13.2	10.3
Anemia^{d}	12.7	14.7
Dyspnea	12.7	7.9
Diarrhea	12.2	26.3
Nocturia	12.2	13.5
Hematuria	12.0	6.4
Abdominal pain	11.3	11.3
Dizziness	10.2	8.6
Bone pain	9.2	10.6
Gynecomastia	9.0	7.4
Rash	8.7	7.4
Urinary tract infection	8.7	8.8
Chest pain	8.5	8.4
Hypertension	8.5	7.1
Coughing	8.2	5.9
Pharyngitis	8.0	5.7
Paresthesia	7.7	9.8
Elevated liver enzymes^{e}	7.5	11.3
Markedly elevated^{f}	0.5	2.5
Leading to withdrawal	1.5	2.0
Weight loss	7.5	9.6
Headache	7.2	6.6
Flu-like symptoms	7.0	4.9
Myasthenia	6.7	4.7
Insomnia	6.7	9.6
Erectile dysfunction	6.7	8.6
Flatulence	6.5	5.4
Hyperglycemia	6.5	6.6
Dyspepsia	6.5	5.7
Decreased appetite	6.2	7.1
Sweating	6.2	4.9
Bronchitis	6.0	2.7
Breast pain/tenderness	5.7	3.7
Urinary frequency	5.7	7.1
Elevated alkaline phosphatase	5.5	5.9
Weight gain	5.5	4.4
Arthritis	5.2	7.1
Anxiety	5.0	2.2
Urinary retention	5.0	3.4
Urinary impairment	4.7	3.7
Pneumonia	4.5	4.7
Pathological fracture	4.2	7.9
Depression	4.0	8.1
Vomiting	4.0	6.9
Rhinitis	3.7	5.4
Urinary incontinence	3.7	7.9
Footnotes: ^{a} = Phase III studies of combined androgen blockade (bicalutamide or flutamide + GnRH agonist) in men with advanced prostate cancer. ^{b} = Incidence >5% regardless of causality. ^{c} = 250 mg three times per day at 8-hour intervals. ^{d} = Anemia includes hypochromic anemia and iron deficiency anemia. ^{e} = Abnormal liver function tests reported as adverse events. ^{f} = Elevated >5 times the normal upper limit. Sources:

== Second-generation NSAAs ==
Enzalutamide, along with the in-development apalutamide and darolutamide, are newer, second-generation NSAAs. Similarly to bicalutamide and the other first-generation NSAAs, they possess the same core mechanism of action of selective AR antagonism but are thought to bind to the androgen receptor with higher affinity, prevent nuclear translocation and DNA binding, and induce apoptosis without agonist activity. Theoretically such increased affinity may make them more efficacious. This is because cancer cells use different mechanisms to adapt and this increased affinity for the receptor make it more likely to bind to mutated receptors, to increased production of the receptors, and perhaps other mechanisms of resistance.

=== Effectiveness ===
In comparison to bicalutamide, enzalutamide has 5- to 8-fold higher affinity for the AR, possesses mechanistic differences resulting in improved AR deactivation, shows increased (though by no means complete) resistance to AR mutations in prostate cancer cells causing a switch from antagonist to agonist activity, and has an even longer elimination half-life (8–9 days versus ~6 days for bicalutamide). In accordance, clinical findings suggest that enzalutamide is a significantly more potent and effective antiandrogen in comparison to first-generation NSAAs such as bicalutamide, flutamide, and nilutamide. Moreover, the medication has demonstrated greater clinical effectiveness in the treatment of prostate cancer in direct head-to-head comparisons with bicalutamide.

=== Tolerability and safety ===
In terms of tolerability, enzalutamide and bicalutamide appear comparable in most regards, with a similar moderate negative effect on sexual function and activity for instance. However, enzalutamide has a risk of seizures and other central side effects such as anxiety and insomnia related to off-target GABA_{A} receptor inhibition that bicalutamide does not appear to have. On the other hand, unlike with all of the earlier NSAAs (flutamide, nilutamide, and bicalutamide), there has been no evidence of hepatotoxicity or elevated liver enzymes in association with enzalutamide treatment in clinical trials. In addition to differences in adverse effects, enzalutamide is a strong inducer of CYP3A4 and a moderate inducer of CYP2C9 and CYP2C19 and poses a high risk of major drug interactions (CYP3A4 alone being involved in the metabolism of approximately 50 to 60% of clinically important drugs), whereas drug interactions are few and minimal with bicalutamide.

== Steroidal antiandrogens ==
SAAs include cyproterone acetate (CPA), megestrol acetate, chlormadinone acetate, and spironolactone. These drugs are steroids, and similarly to NSAAs, act as competitive antagonists of the AR, reducing androgenic activity in the body. In contrast to NSAAs however, they are non-selective, also binding to other steroid hormone receptors, and exhibit a variety of other activities including progestogenic, antigonadotropic, glucocorticoid, and/or antimineralocorticoid. In addition, they are not silent antagonists of the AR, but are rather weak partial agonists with the capacity for both antiandrogenic and androgenic actions. Of the SAAs, CPA is the only one that has been widely used in the treatment of prostate cancer. As antiandrogens, the SAAs have largely been replaced by the NSAAs and are now rarely used in the treatment of prostate cancer, due to the superior selectivity, efficacy, and tolerability profiles of NSAAs. However, some of them, namely CPA and spironolactone, are still commonly used in the management of certain androgen-dependent conditions (e.g., acne and hirsutism in women) and as the antiandrogen component of feminizing hormone therapy for transgender women.

=== Effectiveness ===
In a large-scale clinical trial that compared 750 mg/day flutamide and 250 mg/day CPA monotherapies in the treatment of men with prostate cancer, the two drugs were found to have equivalent effectiveness on all endpoints. In addition, contrarily to the case of men, flutamide has been found in various clinical studies to be more effective than CPA (and particularly spironolactone) in the treatment of androgen-dependent conditions such as acne and hirsutism in women. This difference in effectiveness in men and women may be related to the fact that NSAAs like flutamide significantly increase androgen levels in men, which counteracts their antiandrogenic potency, but do not increase androgen levels in women. (In contrast to NSAAs, CPA, due to its progestogenic and hence antigonadotropic activity, does not increase and rather suppresses androgen levels in both sexes.)

Bicalutamide has been found to be at least as effective as or more effective than flutamide in the treatment of prostate cancer, and is considered to be the most potent and efficacious antiandrogen of the three first-generation NSAAs. As such, although bicalutamide has not been compared head-to-head to CPA or spironolactone in the treatment of androgen-dependent conditions, flutamide has been found to be either equivalent or more effective than them in clinical studies, and the same would consequently be expected of bicalutamide. Accordingly, a study comparing the efficacy of 50 mg/day bicalutamide versus 300 mg/day CPA in preventing the PSA flare at the start of GnRH agonist therapy in men with prostate cancer found that the two regimens were equivalently effective. There was evidence of a slight advantage in terms of speed of onset and magnitude for the CPA group, but the differences were small and did not reach statistical significance. The differences may have been related to the antigonadotropic activity of CPA (which would directly counteract the GnRH agonist-induced increase in gonadal androgen production) and/or the fact that bicalutamide requires 4 to 12 weeks of administration to reach steady-state (maximal) levels.

All medically used SAAs are weak partial agonists of the AR rather than silent antagonists, and for this reason, possess inherent androgenicity in addition to their predominantly antiandrogenic actions. In accordance, although CPA produces feminization of and ambiguous genitalia in male fetuses when administered to pregnant animals, it has been found to produce masculinization of the genitalia of female fetuses of pregnant animals. Additionally, all SAAs, including CPA and spironolactone, have been found to stimulate and significantly accelerate the growth of androgen-sensitive tumors in the absence of androgens, whereas NSAAs like flutamide have no effect and can in fact antagonize the stimulation caused by SAAs. Accordingly, unlike NSAAs, the addition of CPA to castration has never been found in any controlled study to prolong survival in prostate cancer to a greater extent than castration alone. In fact, a meta-analysis found that the addition of CPA to castration actually reduces the long-term effectiveness of ADT and causes an increase in mortality (mainly due to cardiovascular complications induced by CPA). Also, there are two case reports of spironolactone actually accelerating progression of metastatic prostate cancer in castrated men treated with it for heart failure, and for this reason, spironolactone has been regarded as contraindicated in patients with prostate cancer. Because of their intrinsic capacity to activate the AR, SAAs are incapable of maximally depriving the body of androgen signaling, and will always maintain at least some degree of AR activation.

Due to its progestogenic (and by extension antigonadotropic) activity, CPA is able to suppress circulating testosterone levels by 70 to 80% in men at high dosages. In contrast, NSAAs increase testosterone levels by up to 2-fold via blockade of the AR, a difference that is due to their lack of concomitant antigonadotropic action. However, in spite of the combined AR antagonism and marked suppression of androgen levels by CPA (and hence a sort of CAB profile of antiandrogen action), monotherapy with an NSAA, CPA, or a GnRH analogue/castration all have about the same effectiveness in the treatment of prostate cancer, whereas CAB in the form of the addition of bicalutamide (but not of CPA) to castration has slightly but significantly greater comparative effectiveness in slowing the progression of prostate cancer and extending life. These differences may be related to the inherent androgenicity of CPA, which likely serves to limit its clinical efficacy as an antiandrogen in prostate cancer.

=== Tolerability and safety ===
Due to the different hormonal activities of NSAAs like bicalutamide and SAAs like CPA, they possess different profiles of adverse effects. CPA is regarded as having an unfavorable side effect profile, and the tolerability of bicalutamide is considered to be superior. Due to its strong antigonadotropic effects and suppression of androgen and estrogen levels, CPA is associated with marked sexual dysfunction (including loss of libido and impotence) similar to that seen with castration, and osteoporosis, whereas such side effects occur minimally with NSAAs like bicalutamide. In addition, CPA has been associated with coagulation changes and thrombosis, fluid retention, cardiovascular side effects (e.g., ischemic cardiomyopathy), and adverse effects on serum lipid profiles, with severe cardiovascular complications occurring in approximately 10% of men with prostate cancer. In contrast, bicalutamide and other NSAAs are not associated with these adverse effects. Moreover, high doses of CPA are associated with hepatotoxicity, whereas the risk of hepatotoxicity appears to be smaller with bicalutamide. CPA has also been associated with psychological side effects such as depression, fatigue, and irritability.

It has been said that the only advantage of CPA over castration is its relatively low incidence of hot flashes, a benefit that is mediated by its progestogenic activity. Due to increased estrogen levels, bicalutamide and other NSAAs are similarly associated with low rates of hot flashes (9.2% for bicalutamide vs. 5.4% for placebo in the EPC trial). One advantage of CPA over NSAAs is that, because it suppresses estrogen levels rather than increases them, it is associated with only a low rate of what is generally only slight gynecomastia (4–20%), whereas NSAAs are associated with rates of gynecomastia of up to 80%. Although NSAA monotherapy has many tolerability advantages in comparison to CPA, a few of these advantages, such as preservation of sexual function and interest and BMD (i.e., no increased incidence of osteoporosis) and low rates of hot flashes, are lost when NSAAs are combined with castration. However, the risk and severity of gynecomastia with NSAAs are also greatly diminished in this context.

Unlike spironolactone, bicalutamide has no antimineralocorticoid activity, and for this reason, has no risk of hyperkalemia (which can, rarely/in severe cases, result in hospitalization or death) or other antimineralocorticoid side effects such as urinary frequency, dehydration, hypotension, hyponatremia, metabolic acidosis, or decreased renal function that may occur with spironolactone treatment. In women, unlike CPA and spironolactone, bicalutamide does not produce menstrual irregularity or amenorrhea, nor does it interfere with ovulation.

== Castration and GnRH analogues ==
Castration consists of either medical castration with a GnRH analogue or surgical castration via orchiectomy. GnRH analogues include GnRH agonists like leuprorelin or goserelin and GnRH antagonists like cetrorelix. They are powerful antigonadotropins and work by abolishing the GnRH-induced secretion of gonadotropins, in turn ceasing gonadal production of sex hormones. Medical and surgical castration achieve essentially the same effect, decreasing circulating testosterone levels by approximately 95%.

=== Effectiveness ===
Bicalutamide monotherapy has been reported to be roughly equivalent in effectiveness compared to GnRH analogues and castration in the treatment of prostate cancer. A meta-analysis concluded that there is a slight effectiveness advantage for GnRH analogues/castration, but the differences trended towards but did not reach statistical significance in that study. In mPC, the median survival time was found to be only 6 weeks shorter with bicalutamide monotherapy in comparison to GnRH analogue monotherapy. However, a 2015 Cochrane review reported lower overall survival times (HR = 1.24), greater clinical progression (RR = 1.14–1.26), and treatment failure (RR = 1.14–1.27) with NSAA monotherapy compared to monotherapy with a GnRH agonist or surgical castration.

=== Tolerability and safety ===
Monotherapy with NSAAs including bicalutamide, flutamide, nilutamide, and enzalutamide shows a significantly lower risk of certain side effects, including hot flashes, depression, fatigue, loss of libido, and decreased sexual activity, relative to treatment with GnRH analogues, CAB (NSAA and GnRH analogue combination), CPA, or surgical castration in prostate cancer. For example, 60% of men reported complete loss of libido with bicalutamide relative to 85% for CAB and 69% reported complete loss of erectile function relative to 93% for CAB. Another large study reported a rate of impotence of only 9.3% with bicalutamide relative to 6.5% for standard care (the controls), a rate of decreased libido of only 3.6% with bicalutamide relative to 1.2% for standard care, and a rate of 9.2% with bicalutamide for hot flashes relative to 5.4% for standard care. One other study reported decreased libido, impotence, and hot flashes in only 3.8%, 16.9%, and 3.1% of bicalutamide-treated patients, respectively, relative to 1.3%, 7.1%, and 3.6% for placebo. It has been proposed that due to the lower relative effect of NSAAs on sexual interest and activity, with two-thirds of advanced mPC patients treated with them retaining sexual interest, these drugs may result in improved quality of life and thus be preferable for those who wish to retain sexual interest and function relative to other antiandrogen therapies in prostate cancer. Also, bicalutamide differs from GnRH analogues (which decrease BMD and significantly increase the risk of bone fractures) in that it has well-documented benefits on BMD, effects that are likely due to increased levels of estrogen.

A 2015 Cochrane review found that NSAA monotherapy for prostate cancer had a greater risk of treatment discontinuation due to adverse effects than monotherapy with a GnRH agonist or surgical castration (RR = 1.82). This included a greatly increased risk of breast pain (RR = 22.97) and gynecomastia (RR = 8.43). The risk of other adverse effects, such as hot flashes (RR = 0.23), was decreased with NSAA monotherapy. The quality of the evidence was deemed moderate.
