= Walter Reynolds (disambiguation) =

Walter Reynolds (died 1327) was the Archbishop of Canterbury.

Walter Reynolds may also refer to:

- Walter Bain Reynolds (1869–1949), Canadian politician
- Walter H. Reynolds (1901–1987), American politician
- Wally Reynolds (1911–1995), English footballer
- Walter Reynolds (1975–2020), Canadian physician murdered by a patient, see murder of Walter Reynolds
