= AIDS and Behavior =

- Discipline: HIV/AIDS
- Language: English
- Edited by: Seth Kalichman

Publication details
- History: 1997–present
- Publisher: Springer Science+Business Media
- Frequency: 9/year
- Impact factor: 3.895 (2020)

Standard abbreviations
- ISO 4: AIDS Behav.

Indexing
- CODEN: AIBEFC
- ISSN: 1090-7165 (print); 1573-3254 (web)
- LCCN: 97643440
- OCLC no.: 44155896

Links
- Journal homepage; Online archive

AIDS and Behavior is a peer-reviewed medical journal covering behavioral aspects of HIV/AIDS research. It was established in 1997 and is published nine times per year by Springer Science+Business Media. The editor-in-chief is Seth Kalichman (University of Connecticut).

== Abstracting and indexing ==
The journal is abstracted and indexed in:

- CINAHL
- Social Sciences Citation Index
- PubMed/MEDLINE
- Scopus
- PsycINFO
- Embase
- Current Contents/Social & Behavioral Sciences

According to the Journal Citation Reports, the journal has a 2020 impact factor of 3.895.
