= Seth Kalichman =

American clinical community psychologist

- Occupation: professor of Social psychology
- Known for: Sexual Compulsivity Scale

Academic background
- Education: PhD, University of South Carolina (Clinical-community psychology), B.A., University of South Florida, 1983 (Psychology)
- Alma mater: University of South Florida
- Influences: Nicoli Nattrass

Academic work
- Era: 21st century
- Discipline: Social psychology
- Sub-discipline: Community psychologist
- Institutions: University of Connecticut
- Main interests: HIV/AIDS
- Notable works: Denying AIDS: Conspiracy Theories, Pseudoscience, and Human Tragedy
- Website: denyingaids

Seth C. Kalichman is an American clinical community psychologist and professor of social psychology at the University of Connecticut, known for his research into HIV/AIDS treatment and HIV/AIDS denialism. Kalichman is also the director of the Southeast HIV/AIDS Research & Education Project in Atlanta, Georgia, and Cape Town, South Africa, and the editor of the journal AIDS and Behavior. He is the developer of the Sexual Compulsivity Scale.

== Education ==
Kalichman completed a B.A. (Psychology) from the University of South Florida in 1983 and then a further PhD in clinical community psychology.

== HIV denialism ==
Kalichman stated in 2009 that "While working in South Africa I became aware of the devastating effects that AIDS denial was having in that country. The former President Thabo Mbeki had enlisted AIDS denialists among his advisors and bought into the idea that scientists are debating the cause of AIDS. Mbeki’s misguided AIDS policies resulted in over 330,000 senseless deaths and 35,000 babies who were needlessly infected with HIV. I was aware of the failure to offer treatment for South Africans living with HIV/AIDS and I knew that AIDS denial was to blame".

Kalichman began researching denialism after reading the work of Nicoli Nattrass and after encountering further HIV denialists in the US, Kalichman spent a year infiltrating HIV denialist groups. He argues that denialism is often a coping strategy, and that followers are often anti-government, anti-establishment, and prone to cognitive distortions; he says that leaders in denialism exhibit paranoid personality disorder.

== Sexual compulsivity scale ==
Kalichman developed the Sexual Compulsivity Scale which is a measure of a high libido, hypersexuality and sexual addiction. The Sexual Compulsivity Scale was developed to assess tendencies toward sexual preoccupation and hyper-sexuality drawing on items of persons who self-identify as having a ‘sexual addiction’ and from sexual addictions self-help group. The scale has been shown to predict rates of sexual behaviors, numbers of sexual partners, practice of a variety of sexual behaviors, and histories of sexually transmitted diseases.

== Academic career ==
Kalichman is the director of the Southeast HIV/AIDS Research & Education Project in Atlanta (Georgia, USA) and Cape Town (South Africa); the editor of the journal AIDS and Behavior; and the author of Denying AIDS: Conspiracy Theories, Pseudoscience, and Human Tragedy, an examination of HIV/AIDS denialism. Royalties from the book fund antiretroviral drugs for people with HIV/AIDS in Africa.

He was previously on the faculties of Loyola University Chicago, Georgia State University, and the Medical College of Wisconsin, where he worked under the direction of Jeffrey A. Kelly to help establish the Center for AIDS Intervention Research (CAIR). Kalichman's research focussed on AIDs in the South Eastern United States and South Africa, his research predominantly funded by the National Institutes of Health since 1992.

== Awards and honours ==
- 1997 Early Career Award in Health Psychology from the American Psychological Association.
- 2005 Distinguished Scientist Award from the Society of Behavioral Medicine.

== Publications ==
- 2018 Pseudoscience: The Conspiracy Against Science "HIV Does Not Cause AIDS': A Journey into AIDS Denialism":MIT Press: edited by Allison B. Kaufman, James C. Kaufman: ISBN 9780262037426
