= 4-Cyano-3-(trifluoromethyl)aniline =

Names
- Preferred IUPAC name 4-Amino-2-(trifluoromethyl)benzonitrile
- Other names 4-Cyano-3-(trifluoromethyl)aniline

Identifiers
CAS Number	654-70-6
3D model (JSmol)	Interactive image
ChemSpider	455494
ECHA InfoCard	100.109.189
EC Number	700-293-1
PubChem CID	522170
UNII	L47D9XHC08
CompTox Dashboard (EPA)	DTXSID80215711
- InChI: InChI=1S/C8H5F3N2/c9-8(10,11)7-3-6(13)2-1-5(7)4-12/h1-3H,13H2 Key: PMDYLCUKSLBUHO-UHFFFAOYSA-N
- SMILES: C1=CC(=C(C=C1N)C(F)(F)F)C#N

Properties
Chemical formula	C_{8}H_{5}F_{3}N_{2}
Molar mass	186.137 g·mol^{−1}

Hazards
- GHS labelling
Pictograms	(GHS06: Toxic) (GHS07: Exclamation mark)
Signal word	Danger
Hazard statements	H301, H302, H311, H315, H317, H319, H330, H335
Precautionary statements	P260, P262, P264, P264+P265, P270, P271, P272, P280, P284, P301+P316, P301+P317, P302+P352, P304+P340, P305+P351+P338, P316, P319, P320, P321, P330, P333+P317, P337+P317, P361+P364, P362+P364, P403+P233, P405, P501
- Except where otherwise noted, data are given for materials in their standard state (at 25 °C [77 °F], 100 kPa). Infobox references

4-Cyano-3-(trifluoromethyl)aniline, also known as 4-amino-2-(trifluoromethyl)benzonitrile, is a cyanated and trifluoromethylated derivative of aniline. It is the starting material in one of the chemical syntheses of the nonsteroidal antiandrogen bicalutamide.
