= Deborah Kottel =

American politician

Member of the Montana House of Representatives from the 20th district
- In office 2007–present

Personal details
- Born: June 15, 1952 (age 74) Gary, Indiana
- Party: Democratic Party
- Education: Loyola University Chicago, DePaul University

Deborah Jean Kottel is a Democratic Party member of the Montana House of Representatives. She represented District 20 from 1995 to 1999, and from 2007 to 2011.

In 1997, Kottel gained national attention for her bill authorizing chemical castration for sex offenders prior to their paroles. The bill, which includes maximum penalties of 100 years imprisonment for offenders who refuse the treatment, was signed into law and remains on the books of the Code of Montana as of 2026. However, a 2020 investigative report by KTVH "failed to discover whether the treatment has ever been court-ordered or used since its passage."
