= Murder of Walter Reynolds =

Murder of a physician in Alberta

- Location: Village Mall Walk In; Clinic, 6320 50 Avenue, Red Deer, Alberta, Canada
- Date: 10 August 2020; 6 years ago c. 11:00 a.m. (MST)
- Attack type: Stabbing
- Victim: Walter Reynolds
- Perpetrator: Deng Mabiour
- Motive: Believed he was being chemically castrated by doctors due to racism
- Verdict: Died in prison before verdict was reached

On 10 August 2020, Canadian physician Dr. Walter Reynolds was attacked with a machete and hammer by former patient Deng Mabiour in a walk-in clinic in Red Deer, Alberta, Reynolds later died in hospital. The murder received widespread coverage within Canada due to its brutal nature and the perpetrator's unusual motive, it also brought wider attention to the issue of physician abuse in Canada.

== Background ==
According to the RCMP interview with Mabiour, in 2012 he became sick with Hodgkin's Disease. His test results were sent to the Village Mall Walk In Clinic, and he was later sent to the Red Deer Regional Hospital by Willem Grabe, where he was diagnosed with colon cancer. After experiencing pain and swelling, the next day he went to the clinic where Reynolds gave him pills. Mabiour began to believe that he was being chemically castrated by the doctors and the Alberta Government due to his skin colour. Chemical castration is a common method of treatment for hormone-dependent cancers such as prostate and breast cancers, but not colon cancer.

Once his treatment at the hospital was complete, Mabiour filed a complaint with the College of Physicians and Surgeons of Alberta, which was dismissed. He then wrote to his member of parliament Earl Dreeshen, the Government of Alberta and the Alberta Human Rights Commission but received no response. According to Mabiour, if Dr. Willem Grabe had been at the clinic at the time of the attack, he would have killed him rather than Dr. Reynolds.

== Attack ==
On the morning of the attack, Mabiour threw out his medication before travelling to the clinic via a Red Deer Transit bus. Mabiour brought a hammer and a machete with him concealed in a bag. He entered the clinic and sat down in a chair in an examination room when Dr. Reynolds entered asking what Mabiour was there for. Mabiour didn't answer and instead pulled the hammer he had brought out of the bag and began to strike Reynolds repeatedly over the head. He then took out the machete and began to stab Reynolds in the neck. During the attack, Mabiour assaulted another doctor with the machete. Patients and employees fled the building and the police were called. While waiting for the police to respond, two patients held the doors to the clinic closed to prevent Mabiour from escaping.

The RCMP responded within 2-3 minutes, and when a responding officer tried to enter the building, Mabiour threw the hammer at him. After five minutes, around ten officers entered the clinic and arrested Mabiour. Mabiour had initially planned to die by suicide by cop but instead laid down and surrendered. Reynolds later died in hospital the same day.

== Victim ==
Dr. Walter Reynolds was born in Pretoria, South Africa in 1975. He graduated from the University of Pretoria with a degree in medicine and began practicing as a physician shortly after.

Dr. Reynolds moved from South Africa to Canada in 2003, living in Manitoba until moving to Red Deer in 2006 where he began working as a physician again. He worked as a family physician at the Village Mall Walk In Clinic for 14 years, also volunteering at the Red Deer Regional Hospital during the COVID-19 pandemic. Reynolds was 45 and was married with two daughters.

== Perpetrator ==
Deng Mabiour, 54, was born around 1966 in South Sudan, then the Republic of Sudan. He had fled South Sudan and was in a refugee camp in Ethiopia prior to moving to Canada in the 1990s as a government-sponsored refugee under Operation Lifeline Sudan. He had initially emigrated to Vancouver.

According to his half-brother, while living in South Sudan, Mabiour had been physically attacked and hit on the head, receiving brain surgery after coming to Canada. His half-brother also said that the family had a history of mental illness. He was described by members of the community as being a loner, exhibiting anti-social behaviour often.

Prior to the attack, Mabiour had no criminal history in Canada.

== Trial and death ==
Mabiour was taken into custody at the Red Deer Remand Centre. He had applied for a lawyer via legal aid but later cancelled his request. During his first court appearance on August 12 with the Red Deer provincial court, he was uncooperative, claiming that he was sick and did not remember the attack, during this appearance Mabiour declined needing an interpreter. He made another brief court appearance with the Red Deer provincial court on September 9. During the appearance Mabiour did not respond when being asked if he wanted a lawyer, and instead tried to explain his motive to the judge, along with complaining about his knee being sore. When asked if he understood the charges he did not respond, leading to the judge requesting him to be assessed as to whether he was fit to stand trial.

Due to the COVID-19 pandemic, all court appearances were made by video call. Mabiour was later determined to be fit to stand trial, being transferred from the Southern Alberta Forensic Psychiatry Centre to the Calgary Remand Centre. Mabiour pleaded not guilty to first-degree murder, assault of a peace officer, and assault with a weapon. He made another court appearance with the Court of King's Bench of Alberta on 20 May 2021, where his jury trial was set to run from November 22 to December 17.

On 1 November 2021, Mabiour died at the Foothills Medical Centre in Calgary, only a few weeks before his trial was set to begin. His cause of death was not revealed, although Mabiour had been receiving treatment for his colon cancer while in custody since March.

== Reactions ==
A makeshift memorial was created outside of the clinic by community members. A GoFundMe for Reynold's family raised over $180,000 CAD within two days of the attack. A vigil was held at Red Deer City Hall on August 12th. Another vigil was held in Edmonton on August 14th. On the day of the attack, condolences were offered by Alberta premier Jason Kenney, health minister Tyler Shandro, and Red Deer mayor Tara Veer. The attack was faced with condemnation from Red Deer's Sudanese community.

The murder also received news coverage in South Africa, owing to Dr. Walter Reynold's background in Pretoria.

The murder had a deep impact on the Canadian medical community, and led to a larger conversation about physician abuse in Canada.

In 2022, an annual memorial run in Red Deer was created in honour of Dr. Walter Reynold, who was an avid marathon runner. On the National Day of Mourning in 2022, a fruit tree was planted in Reynold's memory during a Fallen Worker Tribute memorial ceremony at Bower Ponds Park.
