= Chemical castration =

Castration via anaphrodisiacal drugs

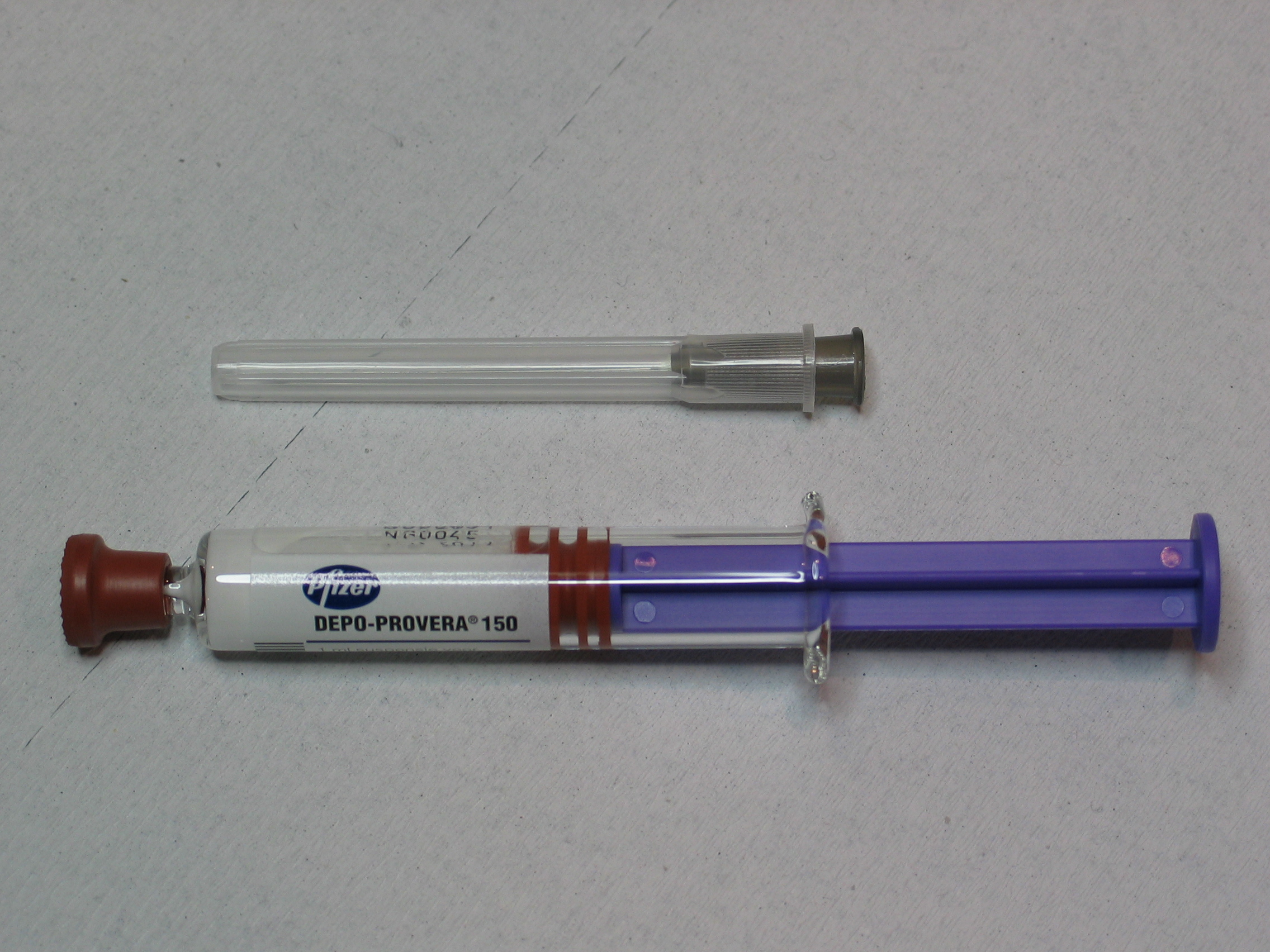
Syringe for Depo Provera (the Pfizer brand-name for depot medroxyprogesterone acetate). Medroxyprogesterone acetate is a medication specified in U.S. legislation authorizing the chemical castration of its sex offenders.

Chemical castration is castration via anaphrodisiac drugs, whether to reduce libido and sexual activity, to treat cancer, or otherwise. Unlike surgical castration, where the gonads are removed through an incision in the body, chemical castration does not remove organs and is not a form of sterilization.

Chemical castration is generally reversible when treatment is discontinued, although permanent effects in body chemistry can sometimes be seen, as in the case of bone density loss increasing with length of use of depot medroxyprogesterone acetate (DMPA). In men, chemical castration reduces sex drive and the capacity for sexual arousal, side effects of some drugs may include depression, suicidal ideation, hot flashes, anemia, infertility, increase in body fat and higher risks of cardiovascular diseases and osteoporosis. In women, chemical castration acts by decreasing testosterone levels in order to lower their sex drive, side effects include the deflation of breast glands, expansion of the size of the nipple and shrinking of bone mass.

Several papers have discussed studies of chemical castration as a treatment for paraphilic disorders and hypersexuality. These conditions (commonly diagnosed in sex offenders) are believed to contribute toward offenders' recidivism. Studies showed reduction of criminal behavior, with several critics arguing for bias in study design. Medroxyprogesterone acetate-based drugs for this treatment remains an off-label use.

== Effects ==
=== On males ===
When used on males, these drugs can reduce sex drive, sexual fantasies, and capacity for sexual arousal. Life-threatening side effects are rare, but some users show increases in body fat and reduced bone density, which increase long-term risk of cardiovascular disease and osteoporosis, respectively. Males may also experience gynecomastia (development of larger-than-normal mammary glands in males); full development is less common unless chemical castration is combined with feminizing estrogen therapy.

Some drugs, such as medroxyprogesterone acetate, cyproterone acetate, and LHRH agonists can decrease serum testosterone and estradiol in the body, thus impairing the metabolism of glucose and lipid. These drugs can also cause depression, hot flashes, infertility, and anemia, aside from cardiovascular diseases and osteoporosis. The risk of side effects caused by chemical castration drugs can increase depending on the length of time under which they are administered. A 2004 study in which eleven men were chemically castrated ended with one committing suicide after one year of treatment; in another 2020 study, increases in suicidal ideations was reported by 8% of its treatment group, which led to the hospitalization of two of the 25 subjects who had been administered degarelix.

=== On females ===
When used on females, the effects are similar, though there is little research about chemically lowering female's sex drive or female-specific anaphrodisiacs, since most research focuses on the opposite, but anti-androgenic hormone regimens would lower testosterone in females which can impact sex drive or sexual response. These drugs also deflate the breast glands and expand the size of the nipple. Also seen is a sudden shrinking in bone mass and discoloration of the lips, reduced body hair, and muscle mass.

== As treatment for cancer ==
A major medical use of chemical castration is in the treatment of hormone-dependent cancers, such as prostate cancer, where it has largely replaced the practice of surgical castration. Chemical castration involves the administration of antiandrogen drugs, such as cyproterone acetate, flutamide, or gonadotropin-releasing hormone agonists.

In 2020, a man in Canada who was receiving antiandrogen drug treatment for colon cancer murdered his doctor over the belief that he was being chemically castrated due to his race.

== As treatment for sex offenders ==
Various drugs (including both hormonal-based and psychoactive drugs) have been studied and used to treat sex offenders.

- The first reported use of hormonally-based medications to reduce pathological sexual behavior occurred in 1944, when diethylstilbestrol was used with the purpose of lowering men's testosterone.
- Cyproterone acetate (CPA, trade name Androcur) was used in experiments to reduce the libido of sex offenders starting with Ursula and Leonhard Laschet of West Germany in the 1960s. By 1975, evidence suggested that the drug was tolerated with side effects of fatigue, gynecomastia, depression. In comparison to drugs studied later for chemical castration, CPA has comparable effectiveness to medroxyprogesterone acetate in suppressing sexual urges and function but appears to be less effective than GnRH modulators like leuprorelin and has more side effects. CPA is approved to treat abnormal sex drive in 20 countries, including Australia and the United Kingdom where it is a documented on-label use. The European Medicines Agency advises that use of "should only be used for reduction of sex drive in sexual deviations in men when other treatment options are not suitable." This warning is for the small but serious side-effect risk of meningioma developing after cumulative doses. Australia and the United Kingdom have issued similar warnings.
- The first experimental use of a depot injection to improve compliance with medications to curb sexual behavior is recorded in a 1973 study by Leopold H. Field of the United Kingdom, using antipsychotic agent benperidol (trade names Anquil, Frenactil) rather than a hormonal agent. Benperidol had previously been attempted for lowering libido in sex offenders, but nausea had prevented compliance in those taking the medication orally. The subjects were 28 sex-offenders who victimized children. Reported effects of the benperidol depot injection included "abolition of sexual desire and inability to obtain an erection either as the result of fantasy of masturbation".
- In 1981, in an experiment by Canadian Pierre Gagné, 48 males admitted to Sherbrooke Hospital with histories of criminal sexual behaviour were given injections of medroxyprogesterone acetate (MPA, or DMPA in depot injection, trade name Depo-Provera). Durations for the administration were up to twelve months with dosage levels tapered after four or five months. Forty of those subjects were recorded as having diminished desires for deviant sexual behaviour, as well as less frequent sexual fantasies and greater control over sexual urges. The research paper recorded a continuation of this improved behaviour after the administration of the drug had ended, with no evidence of adverse side effects, and so recommended medroxyprogesterone acetate along with counselling as a successful method of treatment for serial sex offenders. Medroxyprogesterone acetate is the drug specifically named by legal codes of U.S. states with compulsory chemical castration.
- Leuprolide acetate (LA, a.k.a. leuprorelin and leuprolidetrade; trade names Lupron, Eligard, Lucrin, and Lupaneta) is an LHRH agonist used for chemical castration. The drug was originally used to treat advanced prostate cancer. Studies of the drug for treatment of individual sex offenders are recorded as early as the 1990s, with larger scale studies starting in the 2000s. This drug has been observed as having higher rates of success in reducing abnormal sexual urges and fantasies, but is often reserved for those offenders who are at a high risk of reoffending due to the drug's intense effects including the notable phenomenon known as the "flare", in which testosterone levels temporarily surge by approximately 50% within the first 1 to 2 weeks of therapy.

Psychotherapy has also recently been used in conjunction with chemical castration in order to maximize and prolong the beneficial results. Schober et al. reported in 2005 that when cognitive behavioral therapy combined with leuprolide acetetate was compared to cognitive behavioral therapy alone, the combination therapy produced a much more significant reduction of pedophilic fantasies and urges as well as masturbation. Chemical castration therapy reduces an individual's libido which then makes some offenders more responsive to the introduction of psychotherapy. This combination therapy is most often utilized in those who are at a high risk of offending.

=== Scientific critique ===
Some criminologists argue that the lower recidivism rates seen in male sex offenders who undergo chemical castration might not be due to the medication's biological effects. Instead, one hypothesis is that men who agree to chemical castration — often in exchange for a shorter prison sentence — may simply be more motivated to stay out of prison than those who refuse the treatment. These men might also be more skilled at hiding any new offences, making it appear as though they reoffend less when they actually do not. Additionally, there could be investigation bias, in that police and parole officers might assume castrated men are less dangerous and therefore be less thorough when investigating them and thus causing a self-fulfilling prophecy (in the assumption that castrated men are less dangerous), which could artificially lower the apparent recidivism rate. Some criminologists even suggest that offenders may sell their prescribed medications on the black market, giving them extra income to fund ways to conceal their criminal behaviour more effectively than untreated offenders.

Separately, some neurologists acknowledge that testosterone plays a role in sexual arousal but argue that simply lowering sex drive may not reduce inappropriate sexual behaviour. They explain that when internal sexual arousal signals are weaker (because of reduced testosterone), individuals may require stronger and more specific external stimuli to achieve satisfaction. This could make it harder for former offenders to manage their remaining sex drive through ordinary masturbation without pornography or other preferred stimuli. In other words, reducing sex drive biologically might inadvertently increase the need for risky or socially unacceptable outlets rather than solving the underlying behavioural problems.

While chemical castration through anti-androgens may be viewed as uniquely providing retribution for sex offenses, incapacitation of offenders is possible by lowering their libido with psychiatric medication rather than anti-androgens. In the United Kingdom, a program offering treatment for sex offenders ("Medical Management of Problematic Sexual Arousal") evaluated groups of patients using the Sexual Compulsivity Scale (SCS), a psychometric score of libido shown to predict risky sexual behavior. Patients were divided into an unmedicated group, a group treated with anti-androgen cyproterone acetate (CPA), and another treated with selective serotonin reuptake inhibitor-class antidepressant drugs (including fluoxetine and sertraline). While medicated patients had lower SCS scores than unmedicated ones, the SSRI-treated group had lower scores than the CPA-treated group. Guidelines for National Institute for Health and Care Excellence (NICE) note that fluoxetine is not licensed in the United Kingdom for the treatment of hypersexuality and use for this indication is off‑label. As of 2026, a randomized controlled trial sponsored by Nottingham Trent University is underway to investigate and evaluate fluoxetine for this purpose ("Fluoxetine Assisted Sexual Arousal Reduction" or FASAR).

== Chemical castration for sex offenders by country ==
=== Africa ===
==== South Africa ====
In July 2022, a proposed policy of chemical castration for rapists was introduced at the national policy conference of the ruling party, the African National Congress, by the party's Women's League.

=== Americas ===
==== Argentina ====
In March 2010, Guillermo Fontana of CNN reported that officials in Mendoza, a province in Argentina, approved the use of voluntary chemical castration for rapists, in return for reduced sentences.

==== United States ====
In 1966, psychologist John Money became the first in the U.S. to employ chemical castration by prescribing medroxyprogesterone acetate (MPA) as a treatment for a "bisexual transvestite with pedophiliac homosexual incest" in treatment after their wife informed Money about them having sexually abused their 6-year-old son. The drug has thereafter become a mainstay of chemical castration in the U.S. Despite having been extensively used in the U.S. for the purpose of decreasing sexual impulses, the drug has never been approved by the FDA for use as a treatment for sexual offenders.

In the 1990s and beyond, state legislatures in the U.S. have authorized prison and parole authorities to impose chemical castration (via DMPA or equivalent antiandrogen) as a condition of parole or supervised release for sex offenders (particularly those targeting children). The measures are adopted under pressure to deliver "law and order" policies. However, due process and medical ethics concerns led correctional officials in the states that authorized chemical castration in the 1990s to admit they rarely use this authority, with medroxyprogesterone acetate one of several potential psychopharmacological treatments offered to parole-eligible convicts before release. Two states that first approved chemical castration in the 1990s (Oregon and Georgia) later revoked authorization.

===== Legislation by state =====
Current state laws authorizing chemical castration for sex offenders in the United States of America
State	Date enacted	Authorizing legislation	Codified law	Applicable offenses	Overseeing agencies	Notes
Alabama	30 May 2019	Alabama Legislative Acts of 2019 # 522, authored by Steve Hurst	Parole of Persons Convicted of Sex Offense Involving Person Under 13 Years of Age - Chemical Castration Treatment, Title 15 Code of Alabama §15-22-27.4	Any sex offense (defined by Code of Alabama § 15-20A-5) "involving a person under the age of 13 years."	Alabama Department of Public Health; Alabama Board of Pardons and Paroles	"A parolee who intentionally stops receiving the treatment required under this section shall be guilty of a Class C felony."
California	18 September 1996	Chapter 596, Statutes of 1996, authored by William Hoge	Of Other and Miscellaneous Offenses, California Penal Code §645	Sex offenses against children under 13 years of age, including sodomy, molestation, or rape	California Department of Corrections and Rehabilitation	Regulations for implementing the measure are "reserved" in Title 15, California Code of Regulations § 3700, but no specific regulations were published.
Florida	30 May 1997	1997 Florida Statutes Ch. 97-184, authored by Mark Ogles and Anna Cowin	Administration of medroxyprogesterone acetate (MPA) to persons convicted of sexual battery, Fla. Stat. § 794.0235 (1997)	All offenses covered by Florida's sexual battery law (Fla. Stat. § 794.011 (2025))	Florida Department of Corrections	Refusal to appear or allow administration is a "felony of the second degree."
Iowa	6 May 1998	Ch. 1171, Laws of the Seventy-Seventh G.A., 1998 Session, authored by Jeff Lamberti	Sex Offender Special Sentencing And Hormone Treatment, Iowa Code Ch. 903B	Sex offenses against children "twelve years of age or younger"	Iowa Department of Corrections	Those sentenced "shall be required to pay a reasonable fee to pay for the costs of providing the treatment."
Louisiana	25 June 2008	Louisiana Acts 2008, No. 441, authored by Nick Gautreaux	Administration of medroxyprogesterone acetate (MPA) to certain sex offenders, Title 14, Louisiana Revised Statutes §43.6	Aggravated or first degree rape; sexual battery where victim is under the age of thirteen; second degree sexual battery; molestation of a juvenile when the victim is under the age of thirteen; aggravated crime against nature	Louisiana Department of Public Safety & Corrections	Use of "any drug or other substance to reverse the effects of the treatment" punishable as contempt of court; Refusal to appear or allow administration punishable by a sentence of three to five years
Montana	24 April 1997	Montana Laws of 1997, Ch. 334, authored by Deborah Kottel	Chemical Treatment Of Sex Offenders, Title 45 Montana Code Annotated 2025 §45-5-512	Sexual assault, sexual intercourse without consent, or incest with a victim aged 16 years or younger	Montana Department of Corrections	"Failure to continue treatment as ordered by the department of corrections constitutes a criminal contempt of court for failure to comply with the sentence, for which the sentencing court shall impose a term of incarceration without possibility of parole of not less than 10 years or more than 100 years."
Wisconsin	15 June 1998	1997 Wisconsin Act 284, authored by Dean Kaufert	Paroles from state prisons and house of correction, 2023-24 Wisconsin Statutes Ch.304.06 (1q) (b)	Sexual assault against children aged 13 years or younger	Wisconsin Department of Corrections	Legislation mentions "antiandrogens" generally. Any use as a condition of parole is regulated under the Wisconsin Administrative Code.; In practice, Wisconsin Department of Corrections states that antiandrogens are never imposed, and states that it offers "pharmacological treatment to qualifying individuals on supervision" but does not impose them.

California was the first U.S. state to specify the use of chemical castration for repeat child molesters as a condition of their parole under Cal. Penal Code § 645 following the 1996 passage of AB 3339 introduced by Assembly Member Bill Hoge. This law stipulates castration for anyone convicted of child molestation with a minor under 13 years of age if they are on parole after their second offense. According to the text of the law, offenders may not reject the intervention, although they may elect surgical castration instead of ongoing DMPA injections.

At least eight other states (Alabama, Florida, Georgia, Iowa, Louisiana, Montana, Oregon, and Wisconsin) adopted measures authorizing chemical castration before a parole. Alabama was the most recent state to do so 2019.

===== Rarity of use =====
Chemical castration generates considerable press coverage as legislatures debate and pass such measures. Following these measures' passage, there are few records of state courts or correctional agencies using chemical castration, with officials reporting only rare use. Two states have ended their chemical castration programs entirely.

- In 2005, a Palm Beach Post review found that Florida's use of their chemical castration measure was limited to 15 offenders out of a population of 2,300.
- In 2006, the legislature of Georgia repealed the state's chemical castration measure in a package of reforms that otherwise increased penalties for sex offenses.
- In 2010 a spokesperson for the California Department of Corrections in 2010 was quoted by CBS San Diego as having "no information showing the program is actually being implemented on a widespread basis."
- In 2011, Oregon's legislature passed an emergency measure to abolish the chemical castration program, having been unable to staff it.
- A 2020 investigative report by KTVH "failed to discover whether the treatment has ever been court-ordered or used since its passage" in the state of Montana in 1997.
- A 2021 report by the Wisconsin Legislative Council (non-partisan research staff of the Wisconsin State Legislature) found no records of chemical castration's use in the state.
- In 2021, Alabama Department of Public Health told Alabama Daily News that they had never administered medication for chemical castration since it had been legalized in 2019. Writer Caroline Beck pointed out the state's chemical castration statute is may be moot: chemical castration is imposed as a condition of parole, but applies mainly to crimes for which convicts are ineligible for parole entirely.
- A 2024 Associated Press article on Louisiana's new adoption of surgical castration as punishment found that its chemical castration statute (passed over a decade before) had rarely been invoked.
- An April 2026 review of "red tape" regulations by the Iowa Department of Corrections reported that the "utilization rate is extremely low" for its hormonal intervention therapy measure on the books since 1998.

===== Opposition =====
The American Civil Liberties Union of Florida opposes the administration of any drug that is dangerous or has significant irreversible effect as an alternative to incarceration; however, they do not oppose the use of antiandrogen drugs for sex offenders under carefully controlled circumstances as an alternative to incarceration. Law professor John Stinneford has argued that chemical castration is a cruel and unusual punishment because it exerts control over the mind of sex offenders to render them incapable of sexual desire and subjects them to the physical changes caused by the hormones used.

Some people have argued that, based on the 14th Amendment, the procedure fails to guarantee equal protection: although the laws mandating the treatment do so without respect to gender, the actual effect of the procedure disproportionately falls upon men. In the case of voluntary statutes, the ability to give informed consent is also an issue; in 1984, the U.S. state of Michigan's court of appeals held that mandating chemical castration as a condition of probation was unlawful on the grounds that the drug medroxyprogesterone acetate had not yet gained acceptance as being safe and reliable and also due to the difficulty of obtaining informed consent under these circumstances.

Offering criminals the option of chemical castration for a reduction in sentence is an example of compulsory sterilization, as it can leave a subject sterile if they are required to continue treatment for more than 3 years.

=== Asia ===
==== India ====
After the outrage following the gang rape of a woman in Delhi, the Government has submitted a draft proposing chemical castration along with an imprisonment of up to 30 years for rape convicts as part of the anti-rape law in India. The ministry is preparing a detailed bill and the recommended changes are under review. Government is also planning to re-define the Juvenile Act and lower their age. One of the accused in the rape case was a juvenile and aged a few months less than 18 years. A view has been expressed by a section that only those below 15 years should be described as juvenile.

==== Indonesia ====
In 2016, the Indonesian President Joko Widodo introduced a presidential regulation (Government Regulation in Lieu of Law No.1/2016) to allow chemical castration to be handed down as a punishment to child sex offenders. The regulation alters the contents of the 2002 Law on Child Protection (Law No. 23 of 2002). DPR later enacted the regulation and amended the law (Law No. 17 of 2016) to enable chemical castration. Although, a convicted child sex offender convicted in 2019 and eligible to be castrated chemically, the technical details on how the punishment will be carried out was under debate between the Government and Indonesian Physicians Association, resulting the sentence suspended until the technical details made. On 7 December 2020, government finally issued Government Regulation No. 70/2020, that detailing technical details on how chemical castration carried out. The chemical castration punishment carried by specifically appointed physician in central government-run or local government-run hospital, and witnessed by witnesses from Attorney General, Ministry of Law and Human Rights, Ministry of Social Affairs, and Ministry of Health. The drugs used for the sentence however, not declared in the government regulation. The government regulation also authorized Ministry of Law and Human Rights to issue regulation to notify the Attorney General, and Ministry of Health to compile the technical procedure for the clinical assessment, conclusion, and implementation.

==== Israel ====
In May 2009, two brothers from Haifa—convicted child molesters—agreed to undergo chemical castration to avoid committing further crimes.

==== Pakistan ====
In 2020, Pakistan's Prime Minister Imran Khan told a journalist that he would prefer that rapists and child molesters be publicly hanged, but he added that, because he imagined that such capital punishment would gain negative attention for Pakistan on the international stage, he would instead like such offenders to "undergo chemical castration, or surgery be performed so they cannot do anything in future." The Anti-Rape Ordinance 2020, approved by President Arif Alvi in December 2020, allows for chemical castration of rapists without the consent of the offender. Lawmakers gave it permanent approval in November 2021.

==== South Korea ====
In July 2011, South Korea enacted a law allowing judges the power to sentence sex offenders who have attacked children under the age of 16 to chemical castration. The law also allows for chemical castration to be ordered by a Ministry of Justice committee. On 23 May 2012, a serial sex offender legally called Park in the court case was ordered by the committee to undergo this treatment after his most recent attempted offense. On 3 January 2013, a South Korean court sentenced a 31-year-old man to 15 years in jail and chemical castration, the country's first-ever chemical castration sentence.

=== Europe ===
Legislation allowing chemical castration exists in France, the United Kingdom, Poland, Russia, North Macedonia, Belgium and Turkey. The drug cyproterone acetate has been commonly used for chemical castration throughout Europe. It resembles the drug MPA used in the U.S.

==== Estonia ====
On 5 June 2012, Estonia passed a law that allows voluntary chemical castration as a part of complex treatment for less serious sex offenders as an alternative of imprisonment. However, the treatment is rarely used in practice.

==== Germany ====
In the 1960s, German physicians used antiandrogens as a treatment for sexual paraphilia.

==== Moldova ====
On 6 March 2012, Moldova legislated forcible chemical castration of child molesters; the law came into effect on 1 July 2012.

==== North Macedonia ====
In October and November 2013, North Macedonia authorities were working on developing a legal framework and standard procedure for implementation of chemical castration that would be used for convicted child molesters. The castration is intended to be voluntarily, where as for the child molesters that repeat the criminal act it should be mandatory.

==== Poland ====
On 25 September 2009, Poland legislated forcible chemical castration of child molesters. This law came into effect on 9 June 2010; therefore in Poland "anyone guilty of raping a child under the age of 15 can now be forced to submit to chemical and psychological therapy to reduce sex drive at the end of a prison term".

==== Portugal ====
In 2008, an experimental intervention program was launched in three Portuguese prisons: Carregueira (Belas, Sintra), Paços de Ferreira and Funchal. The program developers note the voluntary nature of the program a crucial factor in its success. They initially planned to cover ten inmates per prison, contemplating a possible enlargement to other prisons in the future. The program also included a rehabilitation component.

In 2021, the right-wing populist Chega party pushed for a chemical castration bill in parliament.

==== Russia ====
In October 2011, the Russian parliament approved a law that allows a court-requested forensic psychiatrist to prescribe the chemical castration of convicted sex offenders who have harmed children under the age of 14. The measure passed, allowing for chemical castration with the offender's consent.

==== United Kingdom ====
Cyproterone acetate is available in the UK as Androcur-50 which is "indicated for the control of libido in men with severe hypersexuality or sexual deviation".

A three year trial of voluntary chemical castration was introduced in the UK in 2007 by then home secretary John Reid.

On 30 April 2010, a 30-year-old man in the United Kingdom found guilty of attempting to murder a 60-year-old woman, in order to abduct and rape her two granddaughters (aged eight and two), agreed to undergo chemical castration as part of the terms of his sentence. He was jailed for a minimum of 10 years at the High Court in Glasgow.

"Medical Management of Problematic Sexual Arousal" (MMPSA), a joint program of HM Prison and Probation Service (HMPPS) and NHS England began in a limited number of prisons in England and Wales in 2009. The development of the program through 2025 in England and Wales was described in full in a paper published in the journal Criminal Behaviour and Mental Health. The participants in MMPSA included three groups: non-medicated individuals, individuals provided with anti-androgen drugs, and individuals provided selective serotonin reuptake inhibitor antidepressant drugs. Comparisons of the three groups using the Sexual Compulsivity Scale (SCS) found greater that "over a 3‐month period, mean scores on the SCS dropped by 29.5% for men prescribed anti‐androgens and by 31.4% for those taking SSRIs, whereas no significant change was observed in the non‐medicated comparison group."

In 2025, justice secretary Shabana Mahmood received international attention for announcing that chemical castration would roll out regionally across Britain as a pilot with voluntary participants, and that she was "exploring" if it could be made mandatory. These statements were followed by the 2025 British cabinet reshuffle in which Mahmood was appointed Home Secretary. Later that year, successor justice secretary David Lammy deposited documentation of research and conclusions about the MMPSA program. The document explicitly disclaimed any connection of the program to chemical castration. Lammy and the Ministry of Justice subsequently made a press release announcing that more sex offenders would be offered "chemical suppressants" (including both SSRIs and anti-androgens) to lower libido, but the press release made no mention of chemical castration.

===== The case of Alan Turing =====
In the United Kingdom, computer scientist Alan Turing, famous for his contributions to mathematics and computer science, pleaded guilty in 1952 to a charge of gross indecency for engaging in homosexual acts and accepted chemical castration as a term of his probation, thus avoiding imprisonment. At the time, homosexual acts between males were illegal and homosexual orientation was widely considered to be a mental illness that could be treated with chemical castration. Turing experienced side effects such as gynecomastia (breast enlargement) and bloating of the physique. He died two years later, with the inquest returning a verdict of suicide. In 2009 British Prime Minister Gordon Brown issued a public apology for the "appalling" treatment of Turing after an online petition gained 30,000 signatures and international recognition. He was given a posthumous Royal Pardon in December 2013.

=== Oceania ===
==== Australia ====
Use of cyproterone acetate to "reduce abnormal sex drive" is documented by the Australian Commission on Safety and Quality in Health Care.

In 2010, a 58-year-old repeat child sex offender who had been subject to chemical castration was accused of inappropriately touching and kissing a seven-year-old young girl. He was found not guilty by a jury, which was not informed of the context of his previous offenses.

==== New Zealand ====
In New Zealand, the antilibidinal drug cyproterone acetate is sold under the name Androcur. In November 2000 convicted child sex offender Robert Jason Dittmer attacked a victim while on the drug. In 2009 a study into the effectiveness of the drug by Dr David Wales for the Corrections Department found that no research had been conducted in New Zealand into the effectiveness and such trials were "ethically and practically very difficult to carry out."

== See also ==
- Leuprorelin
- Neutersol
- Nonsurgical neutering alternatives
- Triptorelin
