= Sexual Compulsivity Scale =

Sexual Sensation Seeking and Sexual Compulsivity Scale
- Purpose: measure of high libido

The Sexual Compulsivity Scale (SCS) - Sexual Sensation Seeking and Sexual Compulsivity Scale - is a psychometric measure of a high libido, hypersexuality and sexual addiction. It was developed by Seth Kalichman. It consists of statements that must be rated on how much the taker agrees with them.

Scores on the SCS have been found to predict a range of health outcomes.

== Sexual Sensation Seeking and Sexual Compulsivity Scale ==
Sexual Sensation Seeking and Sexual Compulsivity Scale
| Question/Experiental parameter | 1-Not at all like me | 2- Slightly like me | 3- Mainly like me | 4-Very much like me |
|---|---|---|---|---|
| 1. My sexual appetite has gotten in the way of my relationships. | 1-not at all like me | 2- Slightly like me | 3- Mainly like me | 4-very much like me |
| 2. My sexual thoughts and behaviors are causing problems in my life. | 1-not at all like me | 2- Slightly like me | 3- Mainly like me | 4-very much like me |
| 3. My desires to have sex have disrupted my daily life. | 1-not at all like me | 2- Slightly like me | 3- Mainly like me | 4-very much like me |
| 4. I sometimes fail to meet my commitments and responsibilities because of my sexual behaviors. | 1-not at all like me | 2- Slightly like me | 3- Mainly like me | 4-very much like me |
| 5. I sometimes get so horny I could lose control. | 1-not at all like me | 2- Slightly like me | 3- Mainly like me | 4-very much like me |
| 6. I find myself thinking about sex while at work. | 1-not at all like me | 2- Slightly like me | 3- Mainly like me | 4-very much like me |
| 7. I feel that my sexual thoughts and feelings are stronger than I am. | 1-not at all like me | 2- Slightly like me | 3- Mainly like me | 4-very much like me |
| 8. I have to struggle to control my sexual thoughts and behavior. | 1-not at all like me | 2- Slightly like me | 3- Mainly like me | 4-very much like me |
| 9. I think about sex more than I would like to. | 1-not at all like me | 2- Slightly like me | 3- Mainly like me | 4-very much like me |
| 10. It has been difficult for me to find sex partners who desire having sex as much as I want to. | 1-not at all like me | 2- Slightly like me | 3- Mainly like me | 4-very much like me |

== Related scales ==
- Sexual Compulsivity Scale -
- Dyadic Sexual Communication Scale (DSC)
- Interpersonal Sexual Objectification Scale (ISOS)
- Sexual Relationship Power Scale
- Sexual Satisfaction Scale (SSS)
- Sexual Self-Efficacy Scale-Erectile Functioning (SSES-E)
- The Sexual Relationship Scale (SRS)
- The Sexual Self-Disclosure Scale (SSDS)
- Sexual Self-Efficacy Scale-Erectile Functioning (SSES-E)
