= Proxalutamide =

Chemical compound

Clinical data
- Other names: Pruxelutamide; GT-0918
- Routes of administration: By mouth
- Drug class: Nonsteroidal antiandrogen
- ATC code: None

Identifiers
- IUPAC name: 4-[4,4-dimethyl-3-[6-[3-(1,3-oxazol-2-yl)propyl]pyridin-3-yl]-5-oxo-2-sulfanylideneimidazolidin-1-yl]-3-fluoro-2-(trifluoromethyl)benzonitrile
- CAS Number: 1398046-21-3
- PubChem CID: 60194102
- ChemSpider: 52084193
- UNII: QX6O64GP40
- CompTox Dashboard (EPA): DTXSID901102678

Chemical and physical data
- Formula: C_{24}H_{19}F_{4}N_{5}O_{2}S
- Molar mass: 517.50 g·mol^{−1}
- 3D model (JSmol): Interactive image
- SMILES: CC1(C(=O)N(C(=S)N1C2=CN=C(C=C2)CCCC3=NC=CO3)C4=C(C(=C(C=C4)C#N)C(F)(F)F)F)C
- InChI: InChI=1S/C24H19F4N5O2S/c1-23(2)21(34)32(17-9-6-14(12-29)19(20(17)25)24(26,27)28)22(36)33(23)16-8-7-15(31-13-16)4-3-5-18-30-10-11-35-18/h6-11,13H,3-5H2,1-2H3; Key:KCBJGVDOSBKVKP-UHFFFAOYSA-N

Proxalutamide (developmental code name GT-0918) is a nonsteroidal antiandrogen (NSAA) – specifically, a selective high-affinity silent antagonist of the androgen receptor (AR) – which is under development by Suzhou Kintor Pharmaceuticals, inc., a subsidiary of Kintor Pharmaceutical Limited, for the potential treatment of COVID-19, prostate cancer, and breast cancer. It was approved in Paraguay for the treatment of COVID-19 in July 2021, but has not been approved at this time in other countries.

== Research ==
=== Prostate cancer ===
Proxalutamide is in phase III studies for mCRPC as monotherapy and in combination with abiraterone. In the United States, it is in phase II study as monotherapy for mCRPC.

=== Other indications ===
Proxalutamide is in phase Ic clinical trial in China.

== See also ==
- List of investigational sex-hormonal agents § Androgenics
