= Early Prostate Cancer =

Clinical trial

The Early Prostate Cancer (EPC) programme was a large clinical trial programme of monotherapy with the nonsteroidal antiandrogen bicalutamide (Casodex) plus standard care versus standard care alone in men with early prostate cancer. It was started in August 1995, with the first analysis published in 2002 and the final follow-up published in 2010. The programme consisted of three large randomized, double-blind, placebo-controlled trials in which a total of 8,113 men with localized or locally advanced prostate cancer were treated with 150 mg/day bicalutamide plus standard care (watchful waiting, radical prostatectomy, or radiation therapy) (n=4052) or given placebo (standard care alone) (n=4061). It constituted the largest clinical trial of prostate cancer treatment to have ever been conducted at the time.

The three trials in the EPC programme were as follows:

- Trial 23 (North America; n=3292)
- Trial 24 (Europe, Australia, Israel, South Africa, and Mexico; n=3603)
- Trial 25 (Scandinavia; n=1218) (also known as the Scandinavian Prostate Cancer Group-6 (SPCG-6) study)

Several combined follow-up papers of the EPC programme results were published, including at median 3.0 years in August 2002, median 5.4 years in November 2004, median 7.4 years in February 2006, and median 9.7 years in April 2010.

The EPC programme found that bicalutamide was effective in treating locally advanced prostate cancer. Conversely, it was not effective for localized prostate cancer, where there was instead a statistically insignificant trend toward reduced overall survival with bicalutamide therapy (at median 7.4 years follow-up: HR = 1.16; 95% CI = 0.99–1.37; P = 0.07). The increased mortality with bicalutamide in men with localized prostate cancer was however statistically significant at certain follow-ups in the Trial 25/SPCG-6 substudy of the EPC programme. The preceding findings led to the withdrawal of pre-existing approval of bicalutamide for localized prostate cancer in the United Kingdom and Canada.

Liver safety is an important concern with bicalutamide. In the first analysis of the EPC programme at median 3.0 years of follow-up, abnormal liver function tests had occurred in 3.4% of men treated with bicalutamide and 1.9% of men with placebo. Clinically relevant increases in aspartate transaminase (AST), alanine transaminase (ALT), and bilirubin occurred in 1.6%, 1.6%, and 0.7% with bicalutamide and in 0.5%, 0.3%, and 0.4% with placebo. However, liver changes with bicalutamide were usually transient and rarely severe. Abnormal liver function tests led to treatment withdrawal in 1.4% with bicalutamide and 0.5% with placebo. No cases of fatal hepatotoxicity occurred with bicalutamide in the SPCG-6 substudy of the EPC programme.
