= Vision disorder =

- Disability-adjusted life year for vision disorders (age-related) per 100,000 inhabitants in 2002. no data less than 100 100–200 200–300 300–400 400–450 450–500 500–600 600–700 700–750 750–800 800–850 more than 850
- Specialty: Ophthalmology

A vision disorder is an impairment of the sense of vision.

Vision disorder is not the same as an eye disease. Although many vision disorders do have their immediate cause in the eye, there are many other causes that may occur at other locations in the optic pathway.

== Causes ==
There are many eye conditions that can lead to vision disorder. Some of which are as follows:

- Age-Related Macular Degeneration (ARMD): ARMD is a retinal degeneration disease specifically associated with macula blood vessels, which can result in central vision impairment. It is strongly linked to advancing age, as well as European ancestry.
- Bulging eyes: where the eye (one or both) protrudes or distends out of its orbit. Left untreated, bulging eyes may lead to eye dryness, pain and vision loss
- Cytomegalovirus (CMV) Retinitis: This is an inflammation of the retina caused by infection, which can result in blindness. It occurs in people experiencing suppressed immune systems, most commonly by Acquired Immunodeficiency Syndrome (AIDS).
- Diabetic Macular Edema (DME): is an eye disease specifically related to diabetes, occurring due to fluid build-up in the retina as a result of sustained high blood glucose levels. It can result in blurred vision and vision loss.
- Eye floaters and spots: where visible cloud-like images appear to "float" in an individual's field of vision. Floaters and spots are most commonly related to ageing. They are generally harmless and do not cause blindness
- Eye flashing: characterised by bursts or streaks of light that appear in an individual's field of vision. As eye flashing may indicate impending retinal detachment, medical attention is required.
- Eyelid twitching: where the eyelid muscles contract in an irregular or abnormal pattern. Such movements can cause irritation and fatigue to the eyes.
- Glaucoma: occurs when the optic nerve is damaged and can result in irreversible vision loss, with the potential to pass undetected until this damage occurs. It is caused when aqueous humour fails to adequately drain from the eye, resulting in pressure build-up.
- Keratoconus: vision problems can be caused when the cornea thins and distorts into a conical shape. While the cause is unknown, Keratoconus is believed to be congenital, and can be exacerbated by allergies and eye rubbing.
- Strabismus: where the muscular or neural control of gaze direction fails to align the eyes to a shared locus of visual attention, sometimes leading to double vision
- Uveitis: where the uveal (middle) layer of the eye is inflamed. Uveitis requires medical intervention as it can lead to blurry vision, eye pain, eye floaters, eye redness and vision loss

== Epidemiology ==
It was estimated by the WHO in 2004 that 314 million people worldwide are vision impaired (from all causes), of whom 45 million are blind. Vision disorders are not often targeted by public health initiatives, as mortality causes take priority. However, they can have significant impact on a person's quality of life, affecting performance at school and the workplace if not corrected.

== See also ==
- Blindness, Recovery from blindness
- Amblyopia, Nystagmus, Strabism, Stereoblindness, Stereopsis recovery
- Visual impairment
- Visual field
