= Tolerability =

Degree to which overt adverse effects of a drug can be tolerated by a patient

In pharmacology, tolerability refers to the degree to which overt adverse effects of a drug can be tolerated by a patient. Tolerability of a particular drug can be discussed in a general sense, or it can be a quantifiable measurement as part of a clinical study. Usually, it is measured by the rate of "dropouts", or patients that forfeit participation in a study due to extreme adverse effects. Tolerability, however, is often relative to the severity of the medical condition a drug is designed to treat. For instance, cancer patients may tolerate significant pain or discomfort during a chemotherapeutic study with the hope of prolonging survival or finding a cure, whereas patients experiencing a benign condition, such as a headache, are less likely to.

As an example, tricyclic antidepressants (TCAs) are very poorly tolerated and often produce severe side effects including sedation, orthostatic hypotension, and anticholinergic effects, whereas newer antidepressants have far fewer adverse effects and are well tolerated.

Drug tolerability should not be confused with drug tolerance, which refers to subjects' reduced reaction to a drug following its repeated use.

== See also ==
- Side effect
